= List of Russian narrow-gauge railways rolling stock =

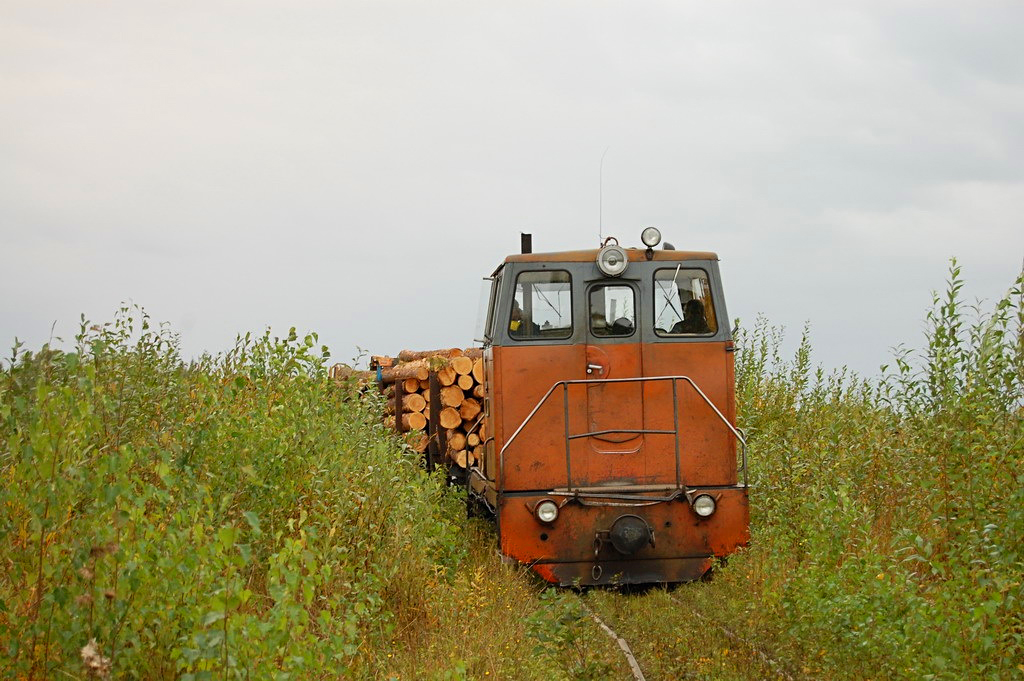
Narrow-gauge railways in Russia

Here is an incomplete list of locomotives and multiple units used by the narrow-gauge railways in Russia.

== Steam locomotives ==
Model	Years built	Manufacturer	Total production	UIC class	Gauge	Photo
K-157 (К-157)	1928–1938	Krasnoye Sormovo Factory No. 112	500	D	750 mm	
159 (159)	1930–1941	Kolomensky Zavod, Novocherkassk Locomotive Plant	990	D	750 mm	
Kp4 (Кп4)	1950–1957	Fablok	500	D	750 mm	
Kc4 (Кч4)	1949–1952	Škoda Works	420	D	750 mm	
GR (ГР)	1947–1956	Lokomotiv Plant Karl Marx	417	D	750 mm	
D51 (Д51)	1936–1951	Kawasaki Heavy Industries Rolling Stock Company	1115	1D1	1067 mm	

== Diesel locomotives ==
Model	Years built	Manufacturer	Total production	UIC class	Gauge	Photo
TU2 (ТУ2)	1955–1959	Kaluga Machine Works	281	Bo′Bo′	750 mm	
TU3 (ТУ3)	1954–1958	ČKD	45	Bo′Bo′	750 mm	
TU4 (ТУ4)	1962–1974	Kambarka Engineering Works	3,210	B' B'	750 mm	
TU5 (ТУ5)	1967–1973	Kambarka Engineering Works	94	B'B'	750 mm	
TU6A (ТУ6А)	1973–1988	Kambarka Engineering Works	3,915	B'B'	750 mm	
TU6D (ТУ6Д)	1978–1988	Kambarka Engineering Works	389	Bo′Bo′	750 mm	
TU6SPA (ТУ6СПА)	1993–today	Kambarka Engineering Works	55	B'B'	750 mm	
TU7 (ТУ7)	1970–1986	Kambarka Engineering Works	3,361	B'B'	750 mm	
TU7A (ТУ7А)	1986–2009–today	Kambarka Engineering Works	3,361	B'B'	750 mm	
TU8G (ТУ8Г)	1988–today	Kambarka Engineering Works	30	B'B'	750 mm	
TU8 (ТУ8)	1988–today	Kambarka Engineering Works	530	B'B'′	750 mm	
TU10 (ТУ10)	2010–today	Kambarka Engineering Works	24	B'B'	750 mm	
ESU2a (ЭСУ2а)	1972–1988	Gubinskiy Machine Works	1034	B'B'	750 mm	
ESU3 (ЭСУ3)	1981–1982	Gubinskiy Machine Works	3	B'B'	750 mm	
TG16 (ТГ16)	1966–1974	Sinara transport machines	95	B'B'+B'B'	1067 mm	

== Diesel multiple units and railcar ==
Model	Years built	Manufacturer	Total production	UIC class	Gauge	Photo
AM-1 (АМ-1)	1962–1972	Demikhovsky Machine-building Plant	297	Bo′2′	750 mm	
TU6P (ТУ6П)	1985–1989	Kambarka Engineering Works	56	B'2′	750 mm	
TU8P (ТУ8П)	1988–today	Kambarka Engineering Works	20	B'B'	750 mm, 1067 mm	
Sokol-D2 (Д2)	1985	Fuji Heavy Industries	10	B'2'+2'2'+2'2'+2'B'	1067 mm	

== See also ==
- Kambarka Engineering Works
- Narrow-gauge railways in Russia
