= Sharya Forest Museum Railway =

Railway line in Russia

Coordinates: 58.382534°N 45.494091°E

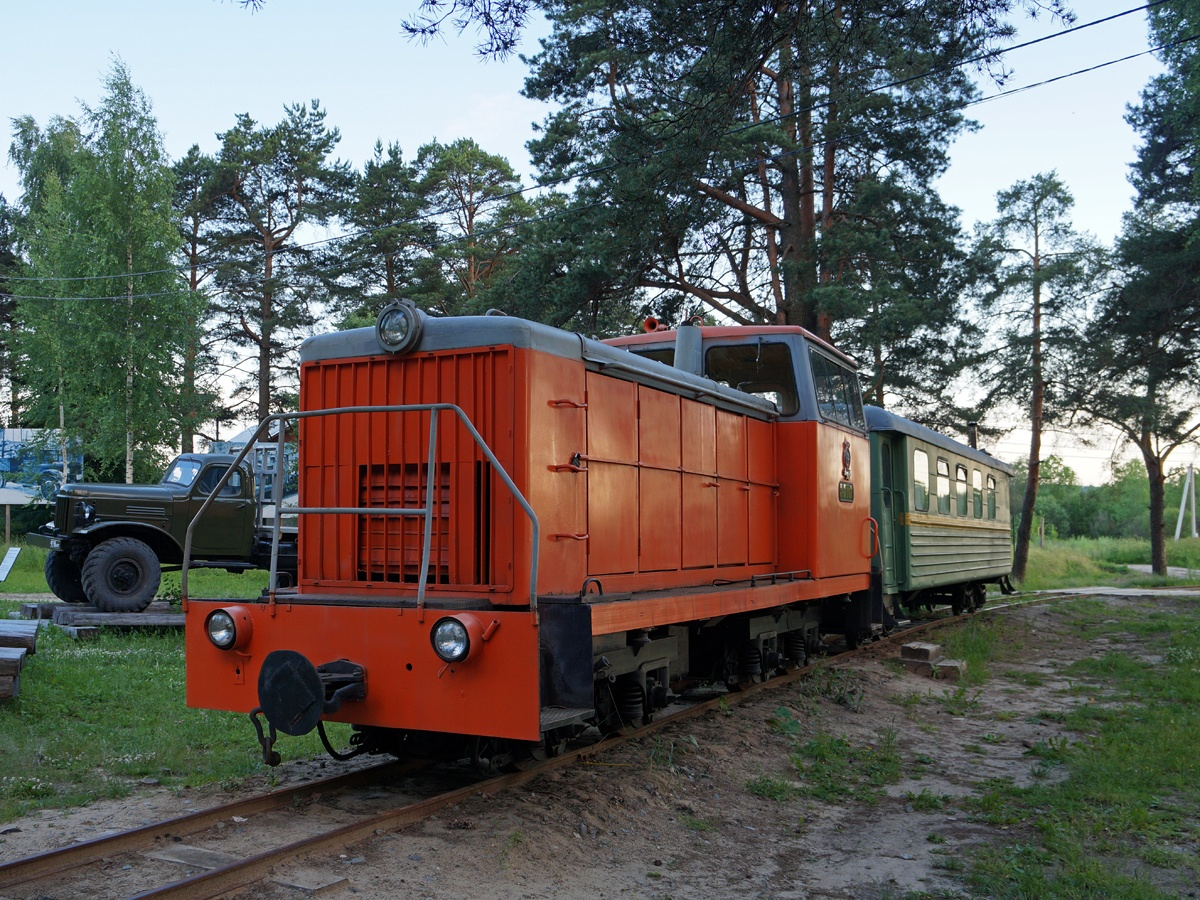

Overview
- Locale: Kostroma Oblast, Russia
- Termini: Sharya

Service
- Type: Narrow gauge railway
- Operator(s): Sharya Forest Museum

History
- Opened: 2014

Technical
- Line length: 2 kilometres (1.2 mi)
- Track gauge: 750 mm (2 ft 5 1/2 in)
Route map
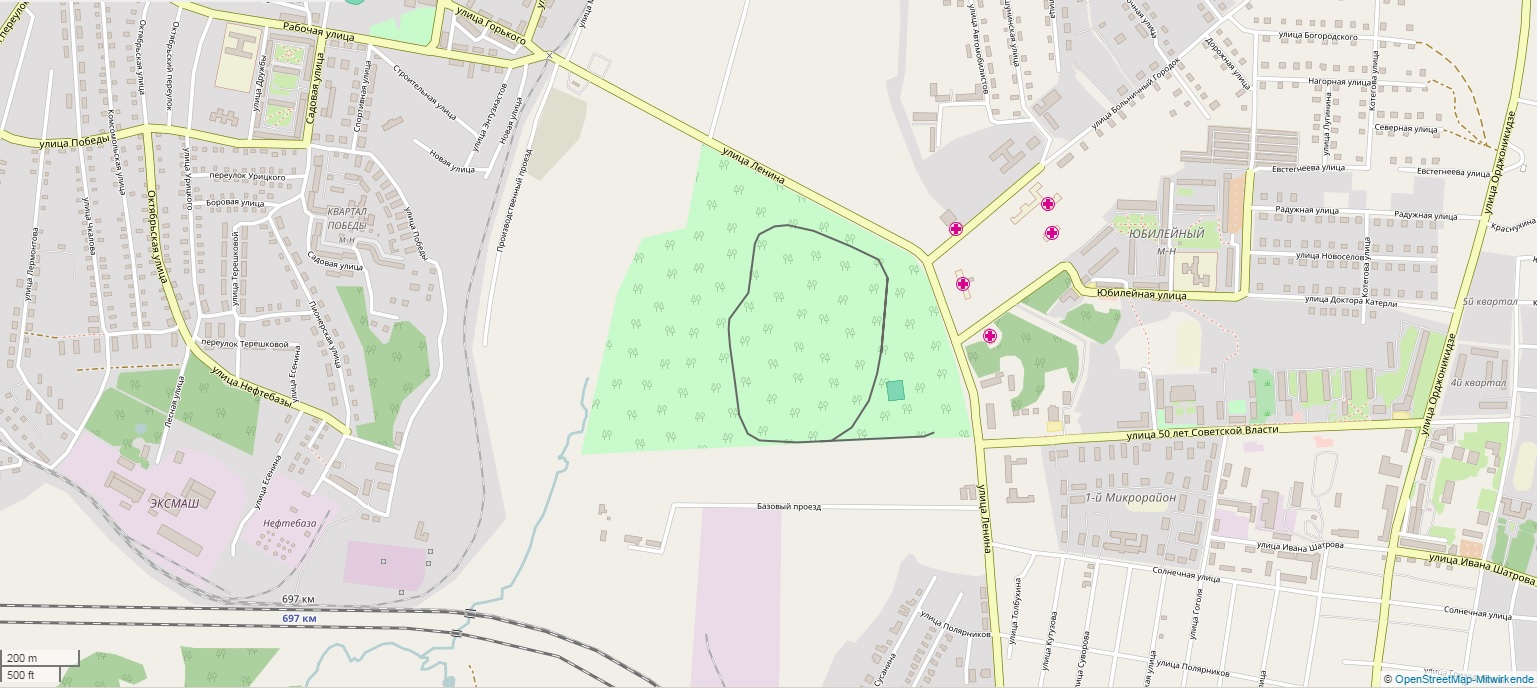

The Sharya Forest Museum Railway (Russian: Узкоколейная железная дорога Шарьинского музея леса) is a 750 mm (2 ft 5 1/2 in)-gauge forest railway based at open-air Sharya Forest Museum located in Sharya, opened in 2014.

== Current status ==
The Sharya Forest Museum Railway is a 750 mm (2 ft 5 1/2 in) narrow gauge railroad loop passing through the Sharya Park in Kostroma Oblast. The museum railway was opened in 2014. It has a total length of 2 kilometres (1.2 mi) and is operational as of 2016.

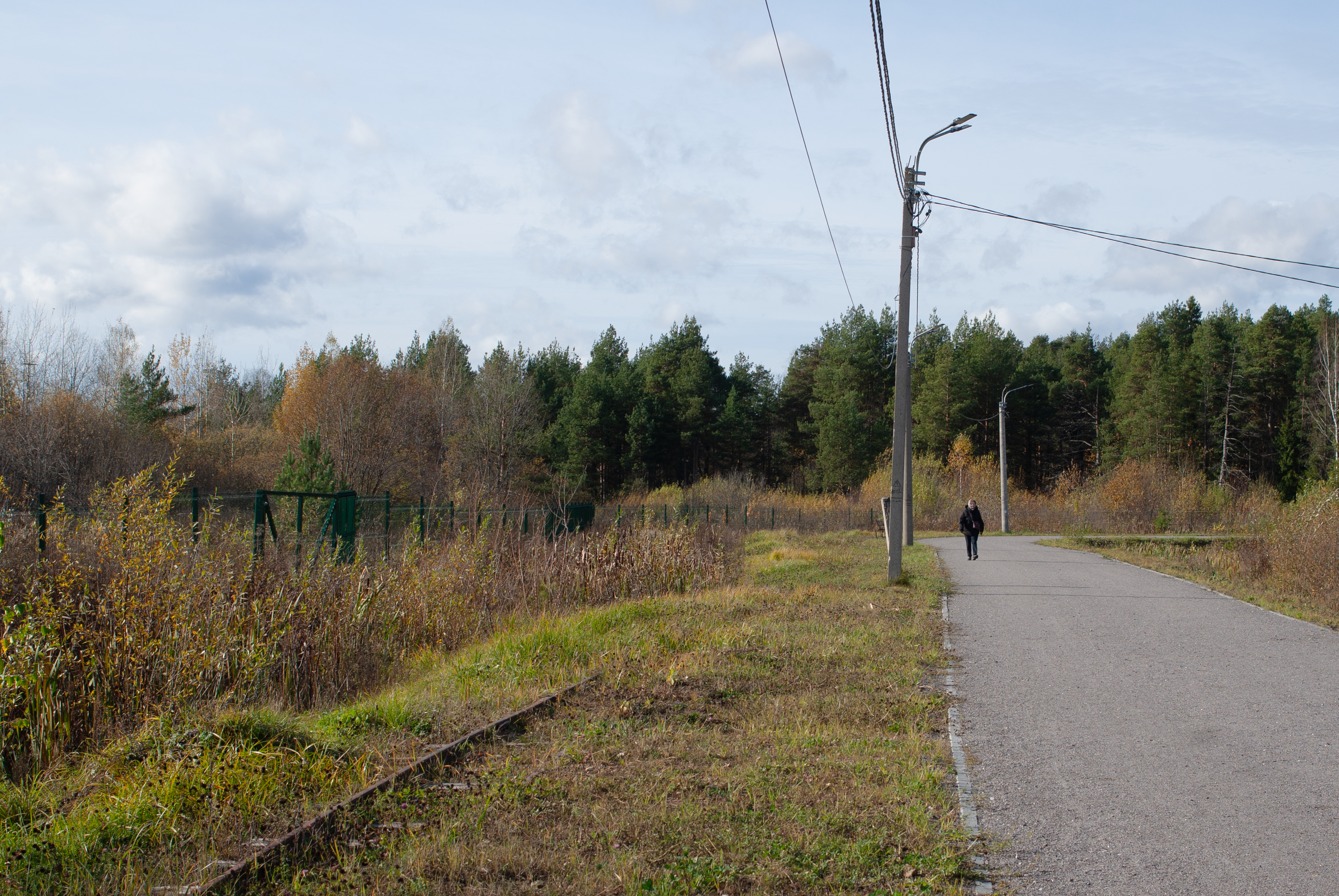
Railway track in 2023

Operation of railway did not started, due to lack of personnel and place for refueling of locomotive. The exhibit consists mostly of locomotives, passenger and freight cars, tractors, skidders, forestry vehicles and machines.

== Museum's collection ==
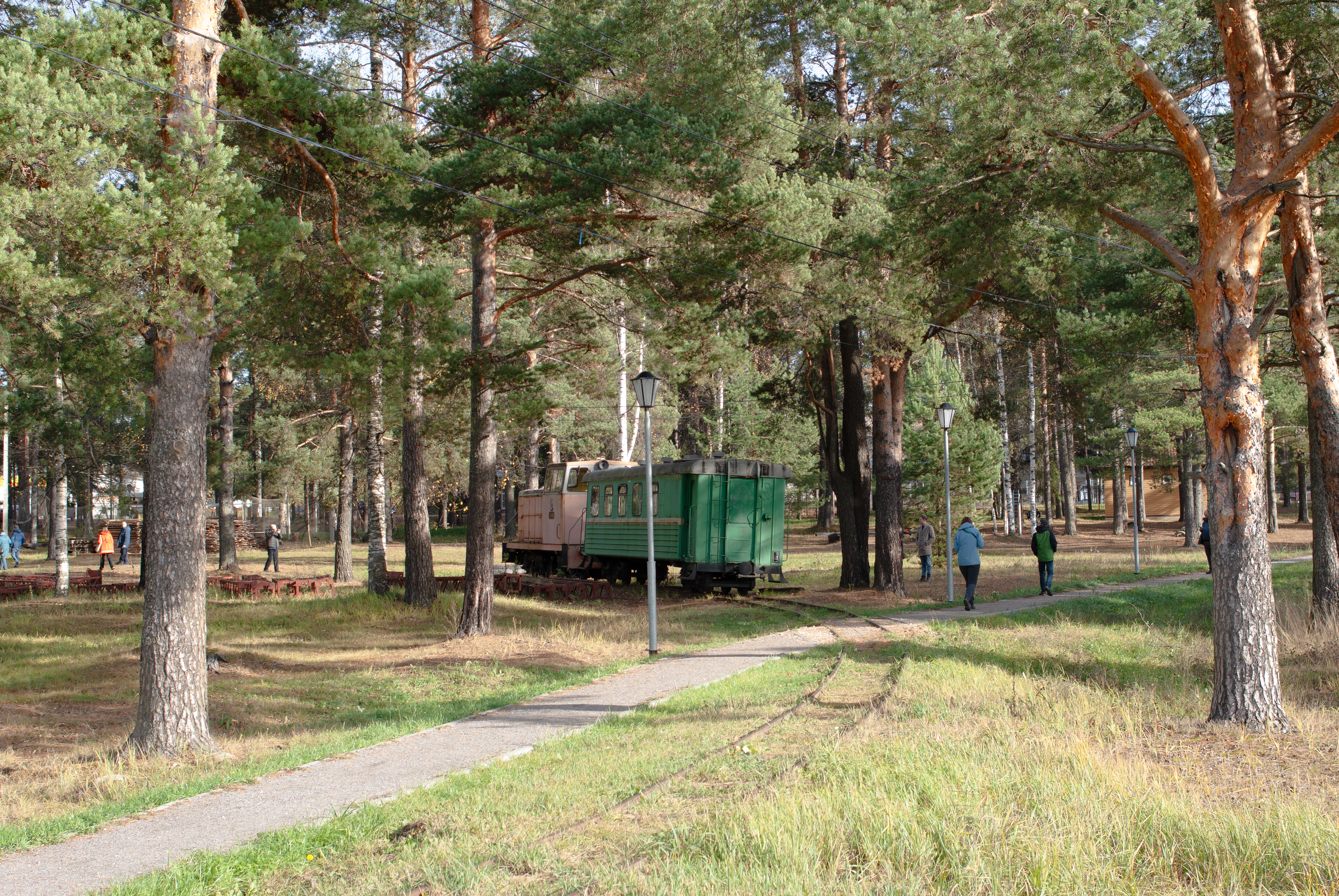
Train (2023)

The museum owns many interesting vehicles, which are important for the Russian railway and forestry history including:

=== Locomotives and draisines ===
- TU8 – No. 0167
- Draisine – TD-5u

=== Railway cars ===
- Passenger car – PV-40T

=== Aeronautical engineering ===
- Plane aircraft protection — An-2 (RA-29327)

== See also ==
- Sharya
- Narrow gauge railways in Russia
- List of Russian narrow gauge railways rolling stock
