= Loyginskaya narrow-gauge railway =

Railway in Arkhangelsk Oblast and Vologda Oblast, Russia

Coordinates: 61.07377°N 44.60378°E

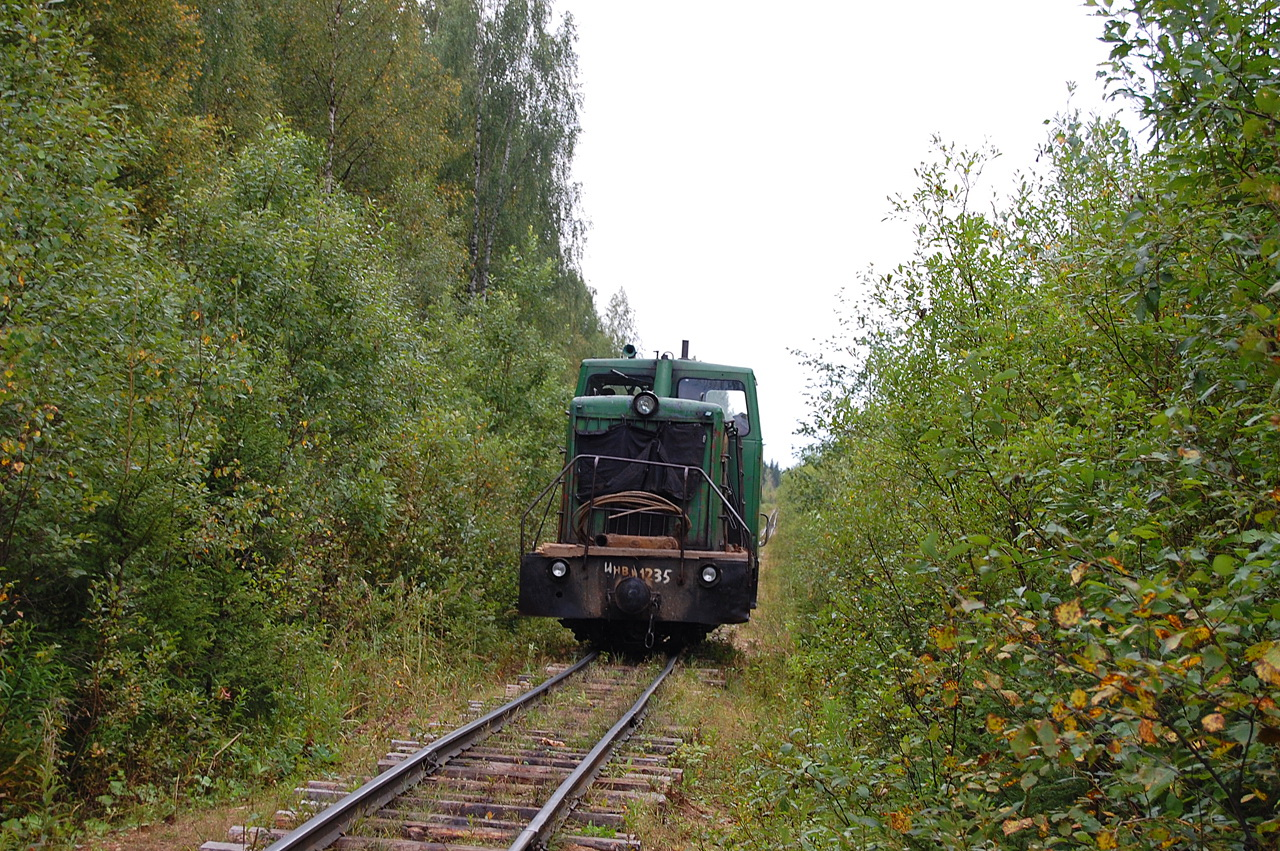

Overview
- Locale: Arkhangelsk and Vologda Oblast, Russia
- Termini: Loyga
- Website: www.volwood.ru

Service
- Type: Narrow-gauge railway
- Operator: JSC «Vologodskiye lesopromyshlenniki»

History
- Opened: 1947

Technical
- Line length: 200 kilometres (120 mi)
- Track gauge: 750 mm (2 ft 5 1/2 in)
Route map
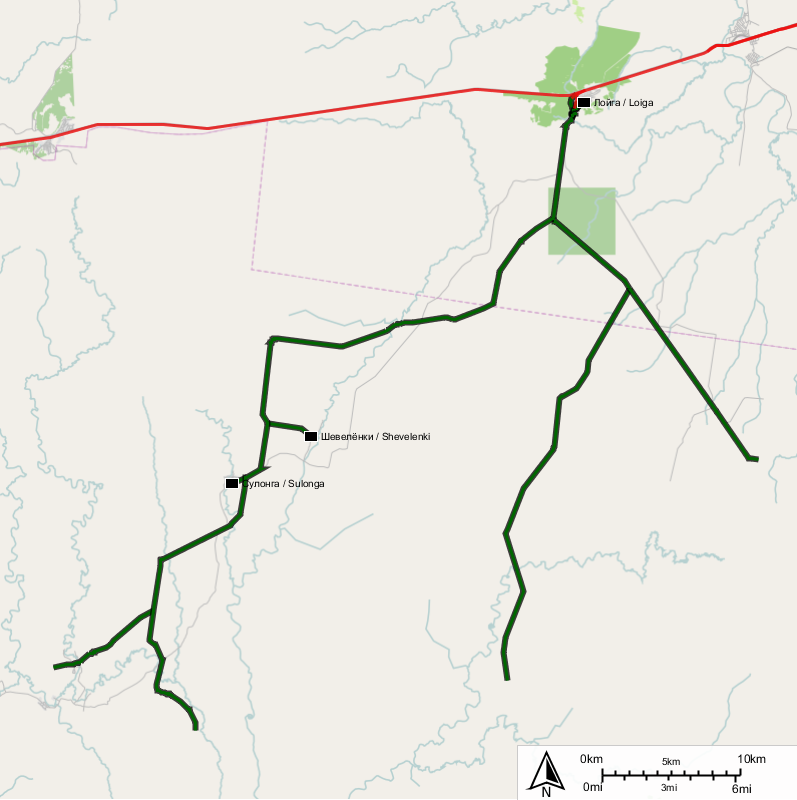

The Loyginskaya narrow-gauge railway is located in Arkhangelsk Oblast and Vologda Oblast, Russia. The forest railway was opened in 1947, and its current operational total length is 200 kilometres (120 mi). The railway is a 750 mm (2 ft 5 1/2 in) narrow-gauge railway and it operates year-round.

== Current status ==
The Loyginskaya forestry railway first line was built in 1947, in the area of Ustyansky District, Arkhangelsk Oblast, starting from the village of Loyga. The total length of the railway at the peak of its development exceeded 308 kilometres (191 mi), of which 200 kilometres (120 mi) is currently operational. The railway operates a scheduled freight services from Loyga, and is used for transportation of felled logs and forestry workers. In 2014 a railway bridge was built over the river Porsha.

== Rolling stock ==
=== Locomotives ===
- TU6D – No. 0214
- TU6P – No. 0002
- TU6A – Nos. 2541, 2621, 2992, 3767, 3897
- TU7A – Nos. 1361, 1497, 3229, 3151
- TU8 – Nos. 0071, 0060, 0408, 0541, 0542

=== Railroad cars ===
- Boxcar
- Tank car
- Snowplow
- Passenger car
- DM-20 "Fiskars"
- Railway log-car and flatcar
- Hopper car to transport track ballast

== Gallery ==
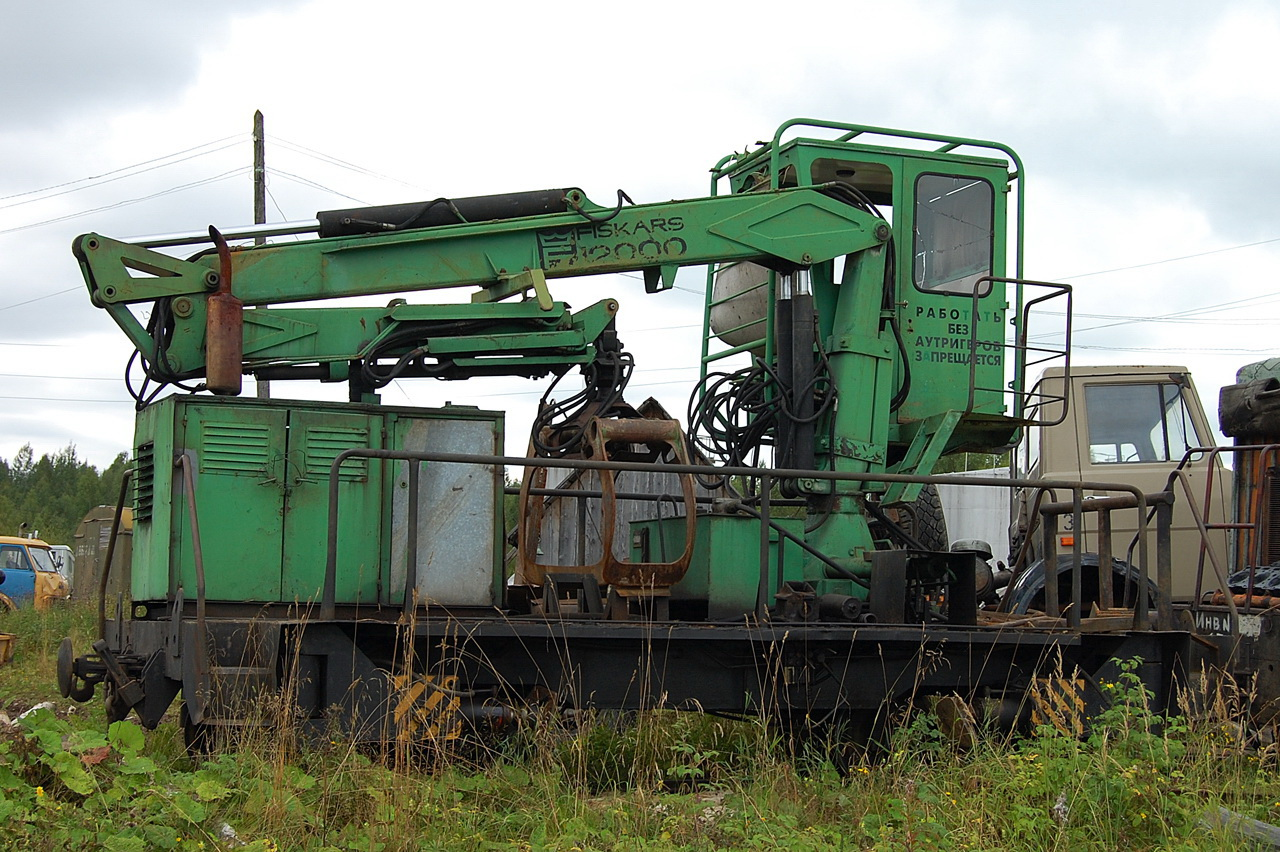
DM-20 "Fiskars"

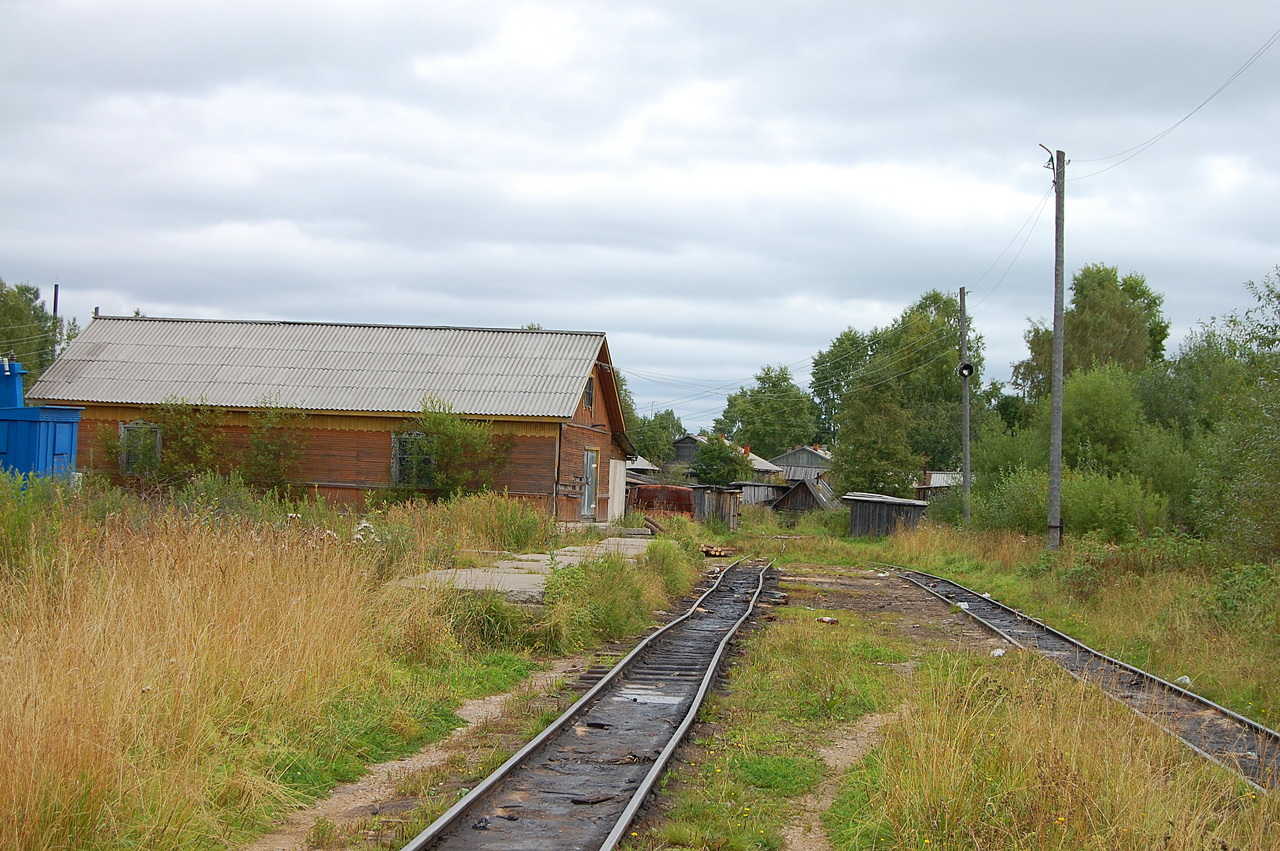
Loyga Passenger Station

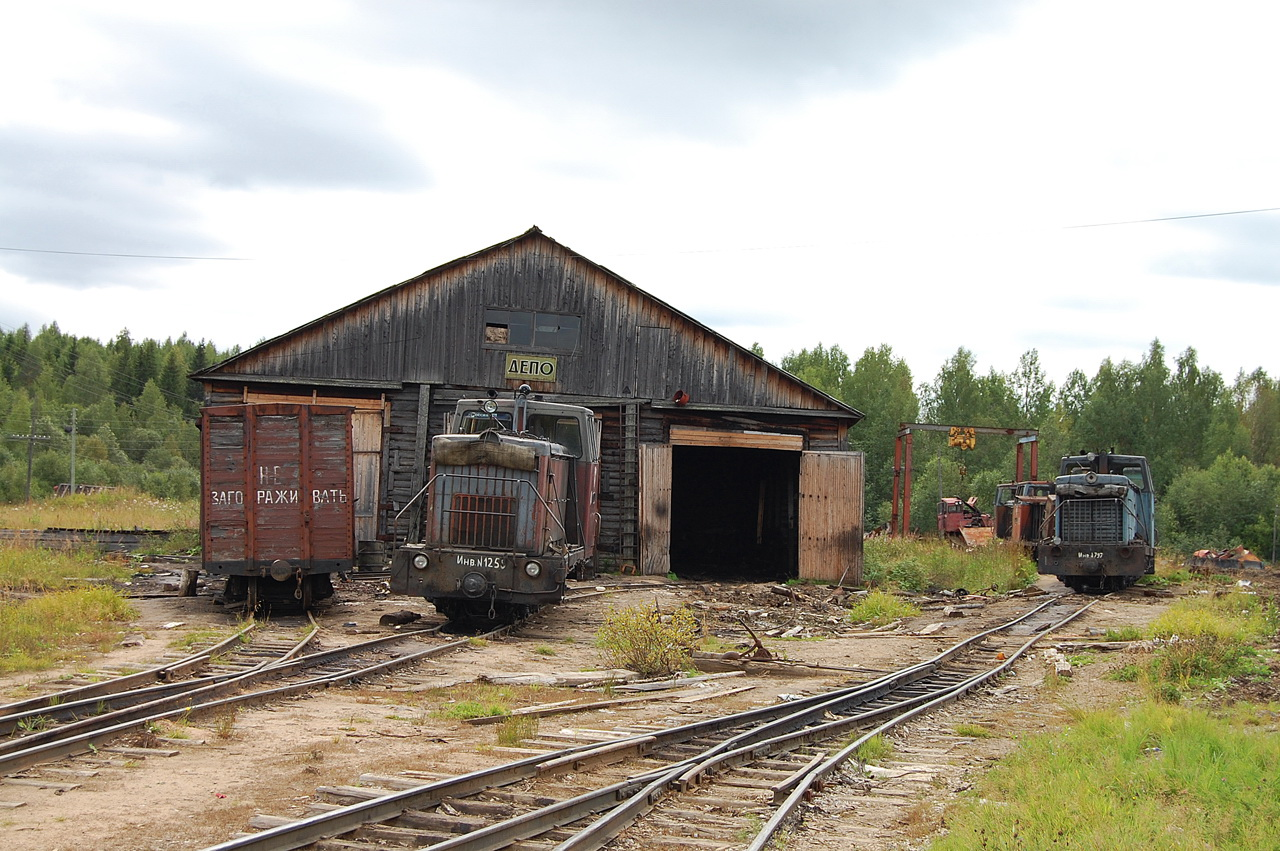
Old locomotive depot

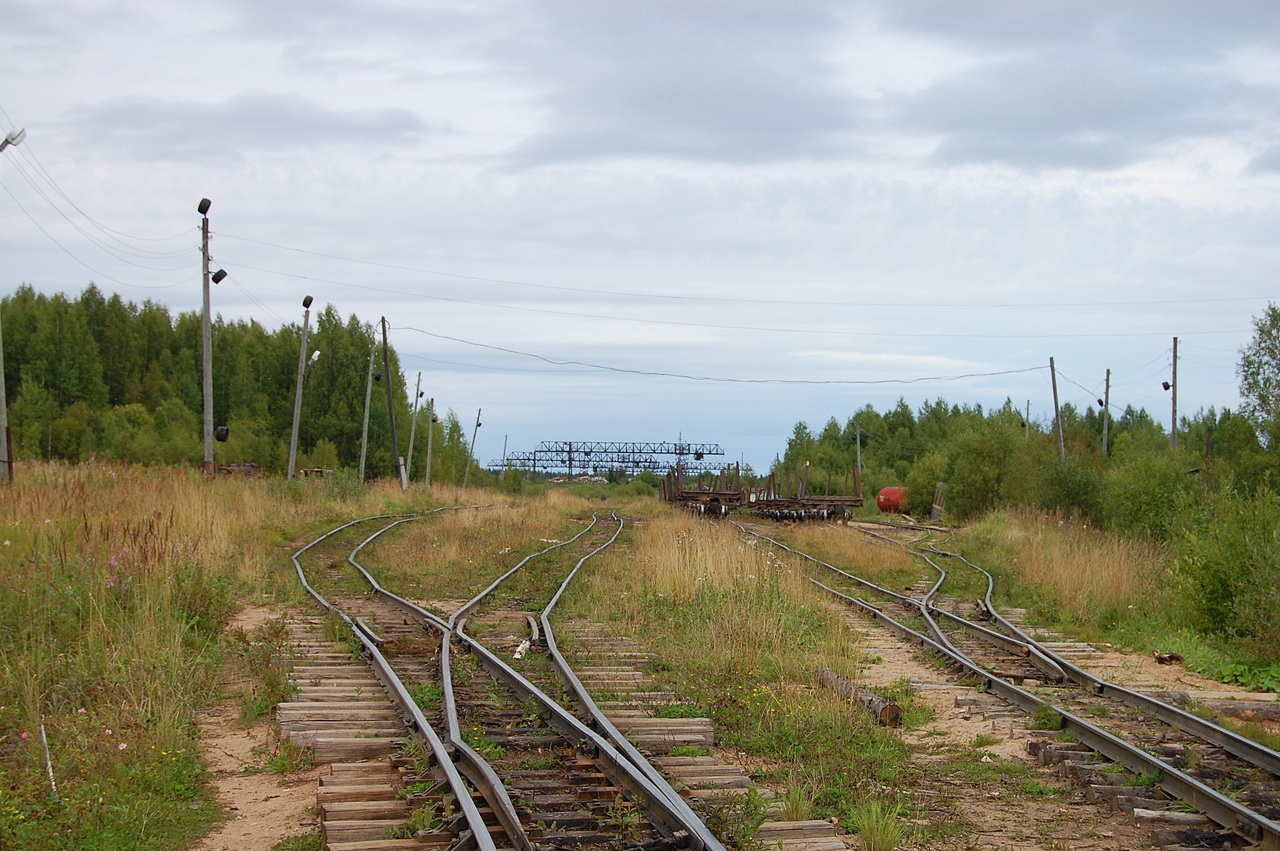
Loyga freight station

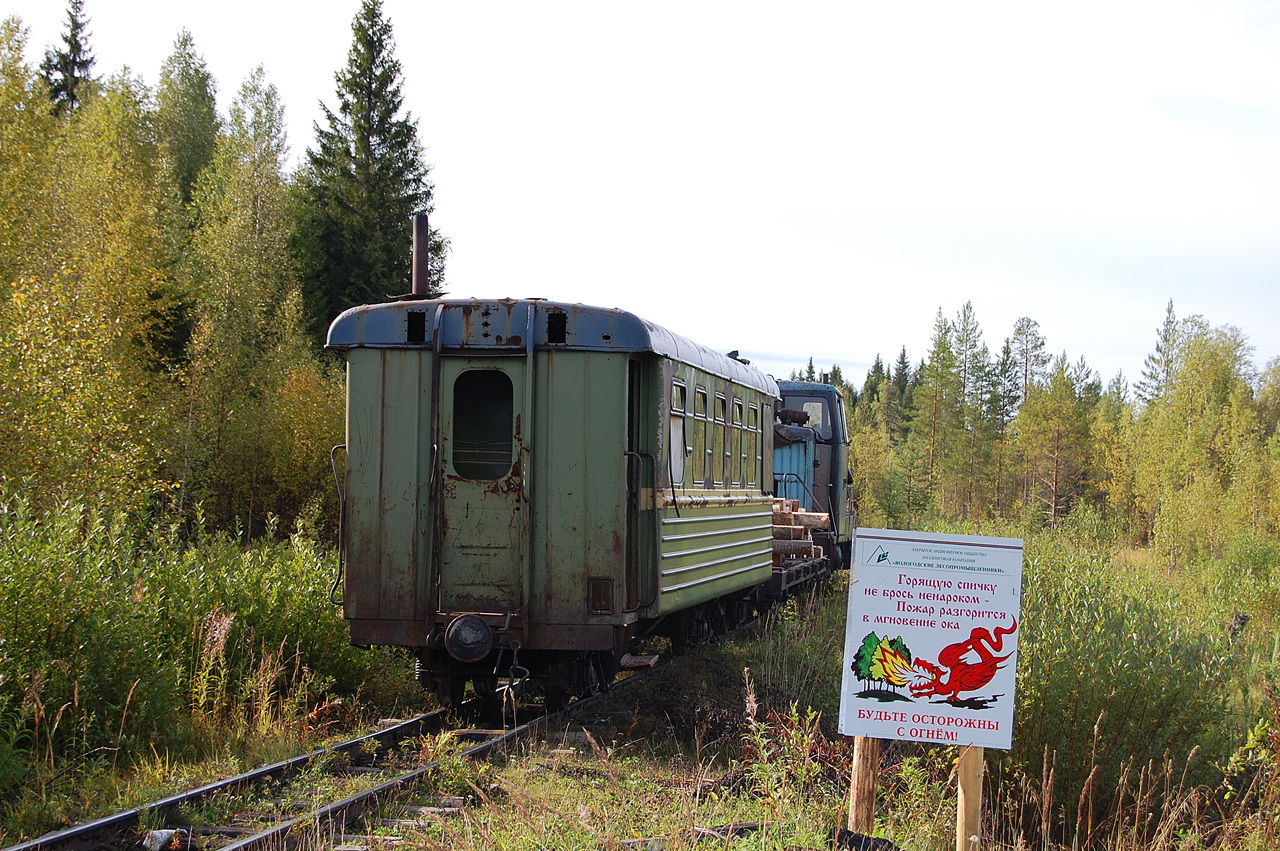
Forestry workers train

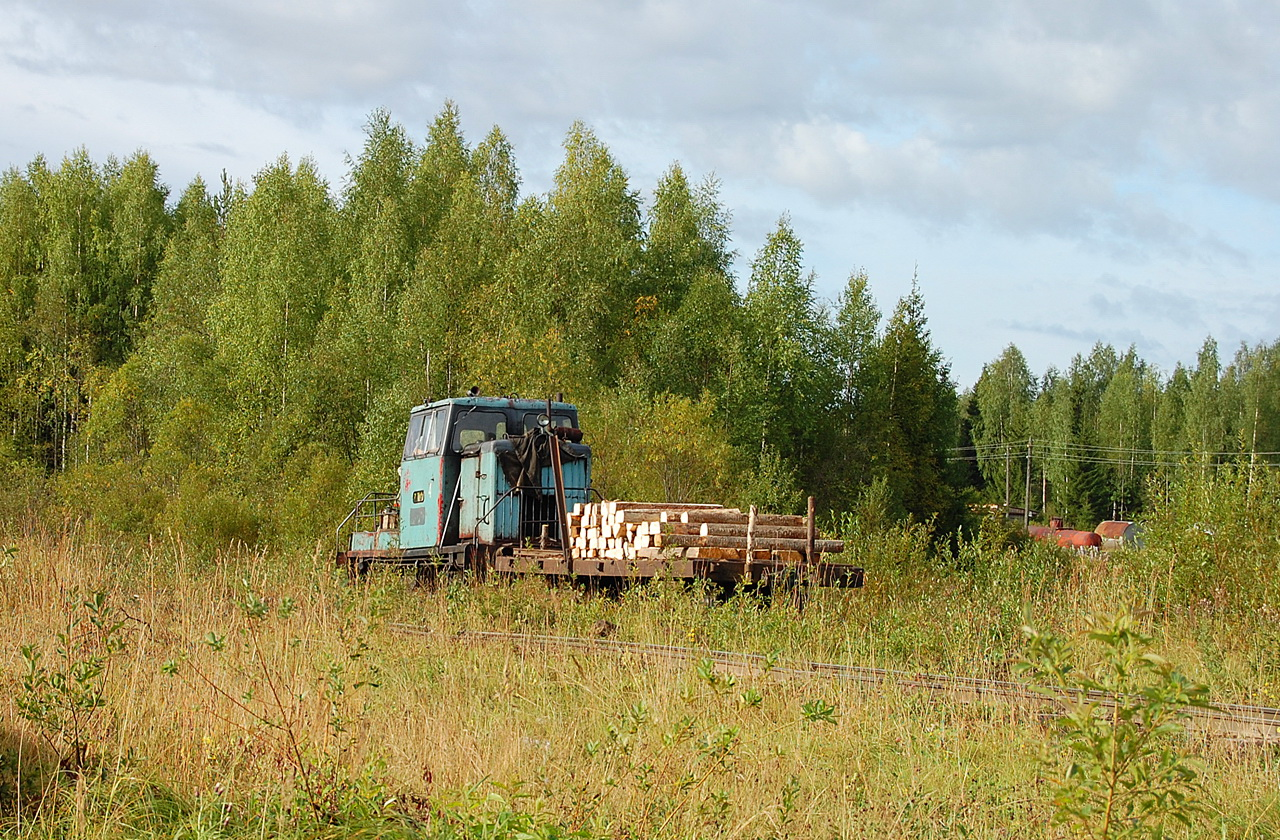
Locomotive TU6D – No. 0214

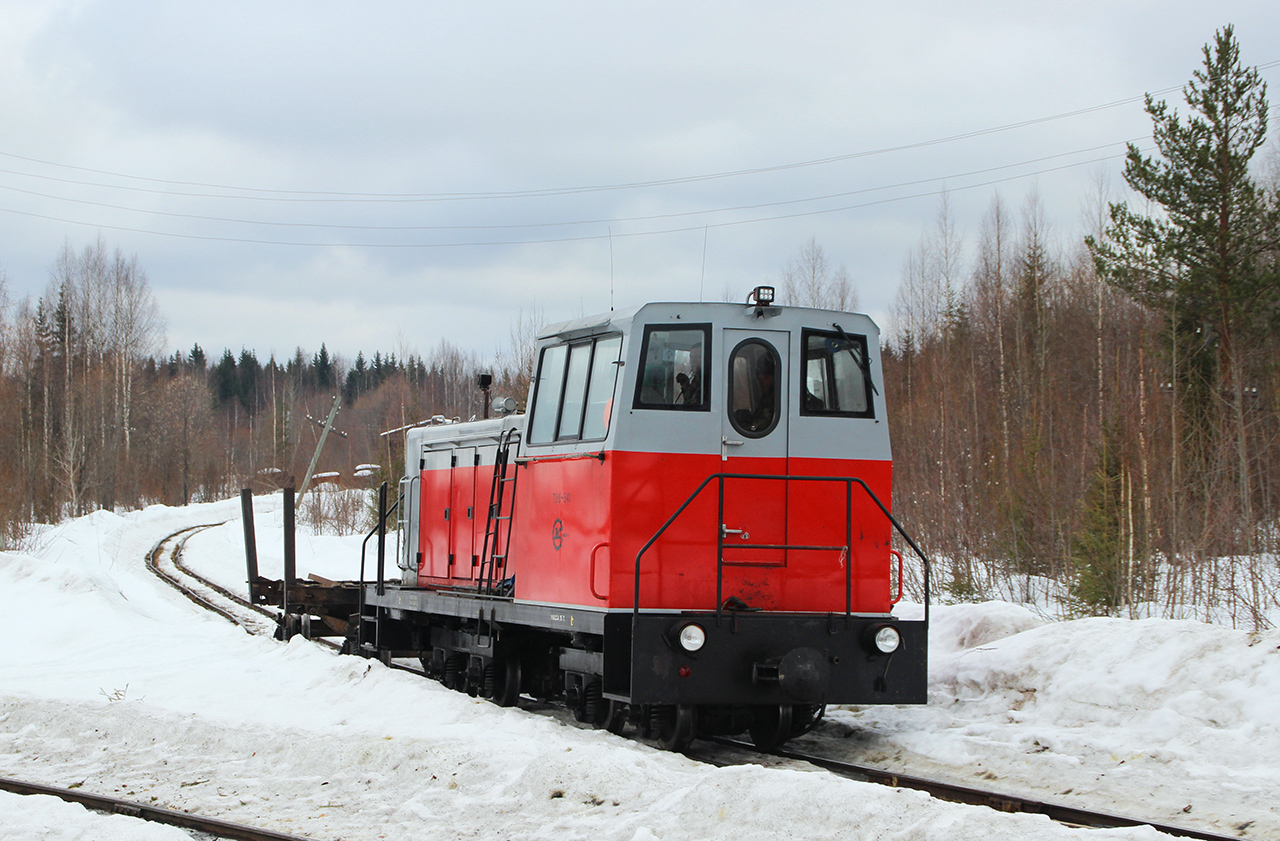
Locomotive TU8-0541

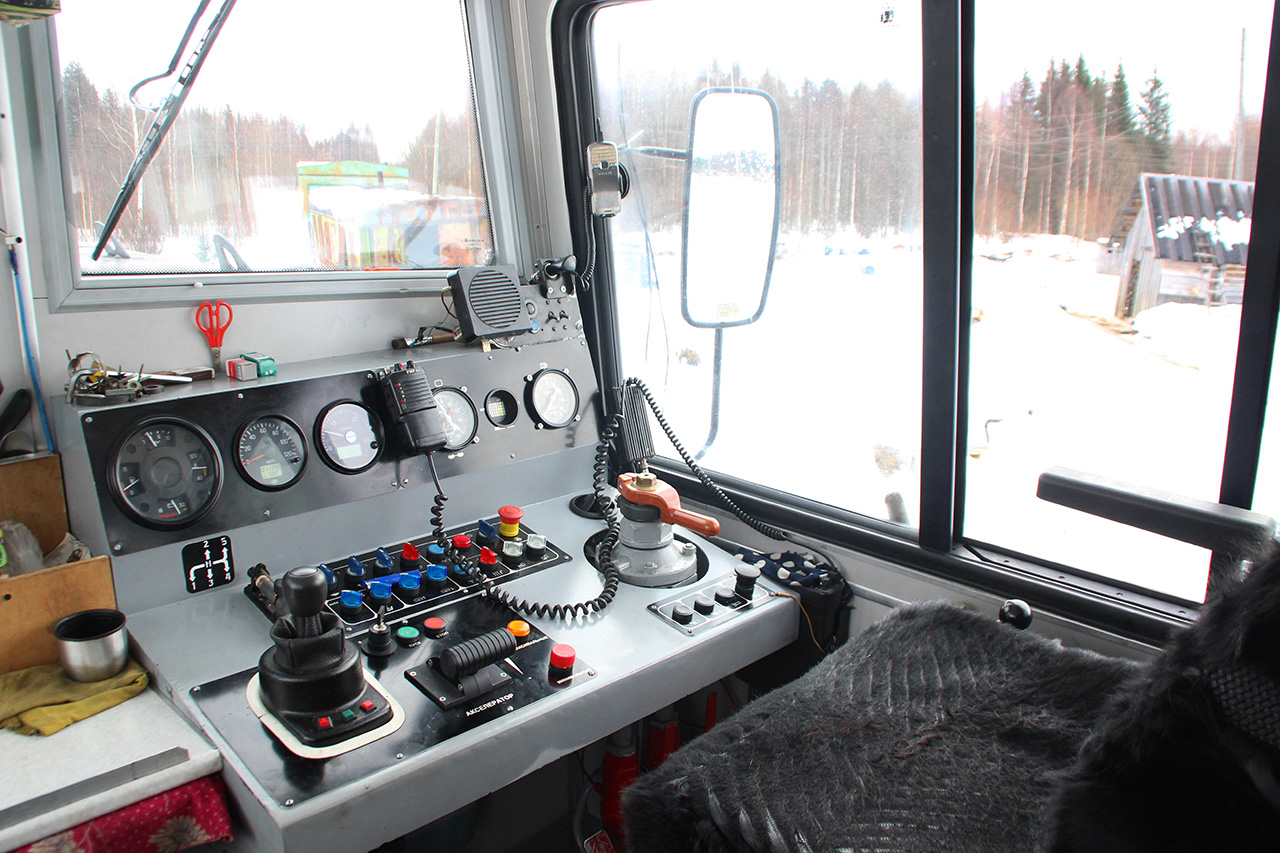
Locomotive TU8-0541

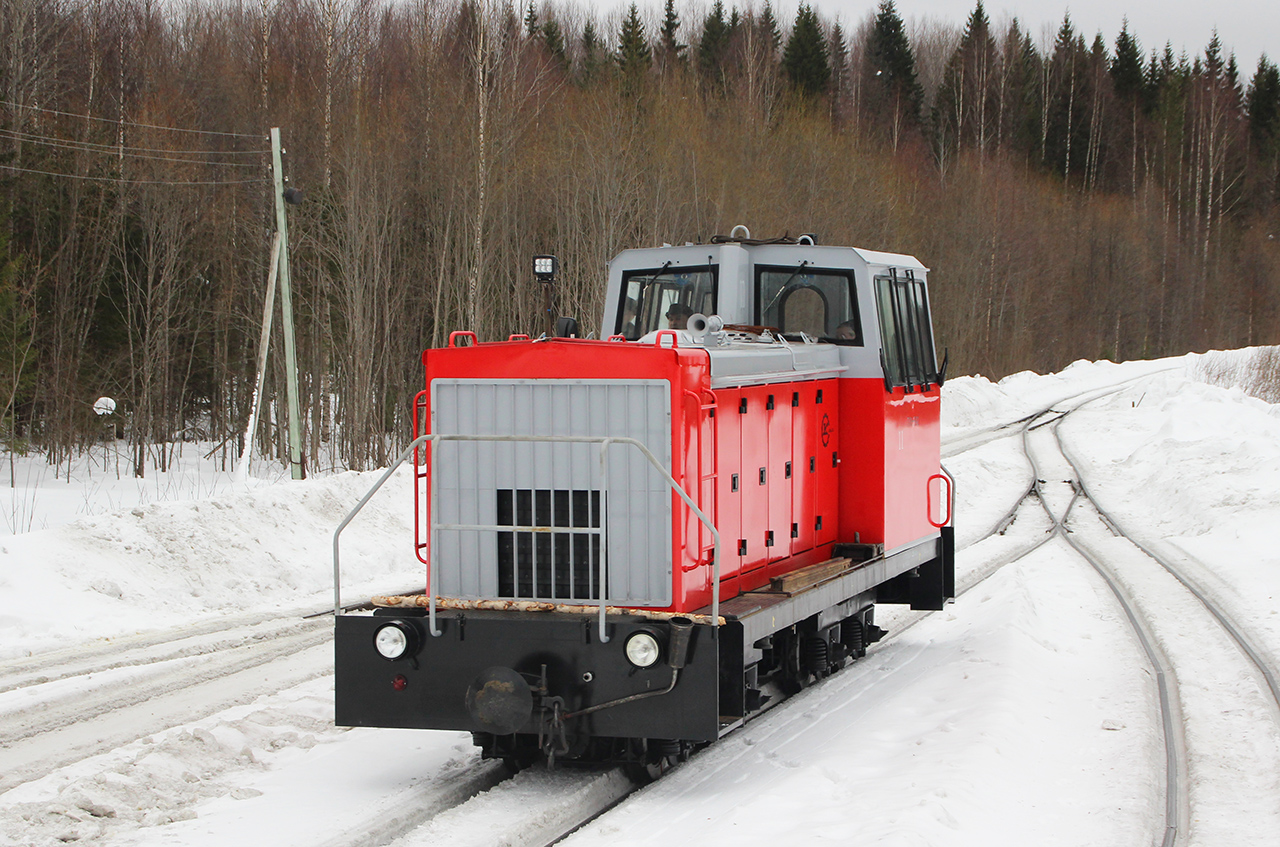
Locomotive TU8-0542

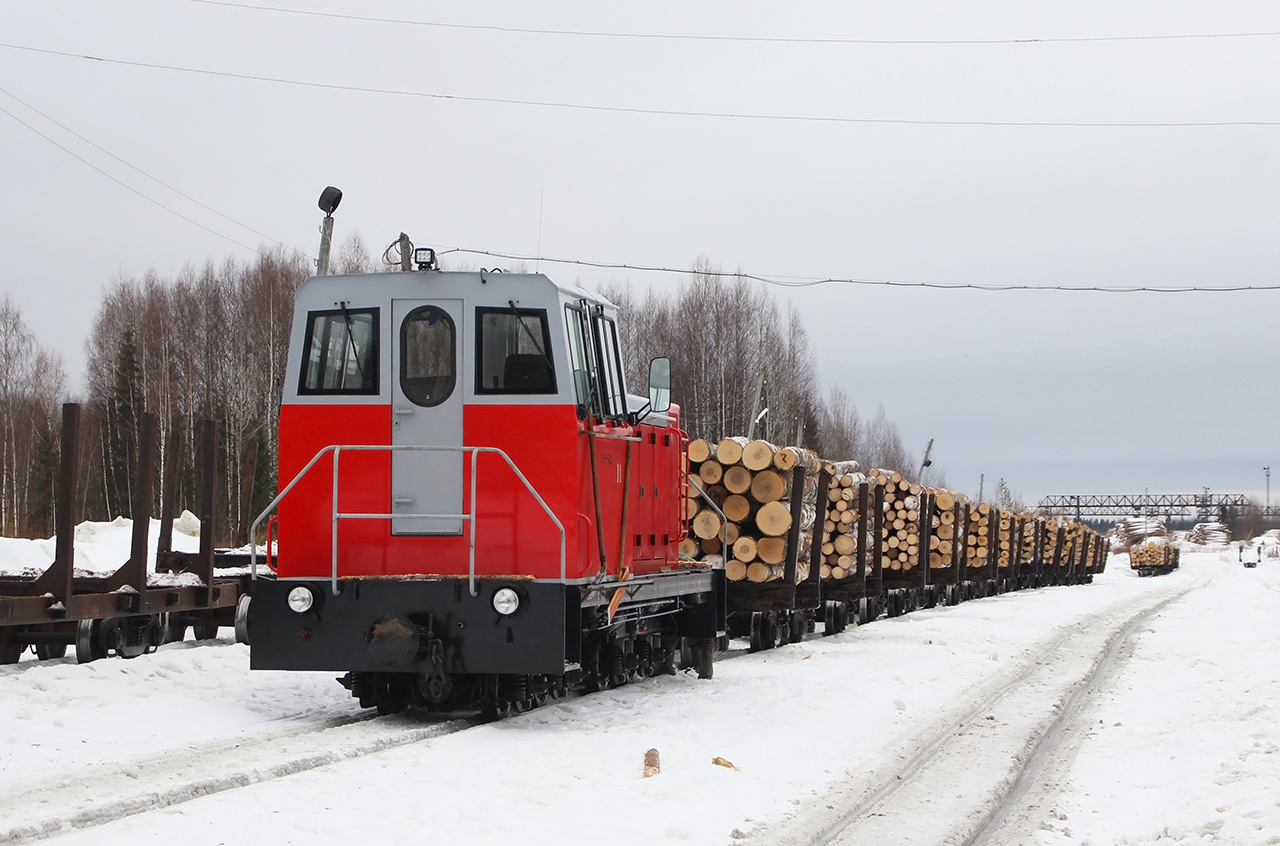
Locomotive TU8-0542

== See also ==
- Narrow-gauge railways in Russia
