= TU8 diesel locomotive =

TU8
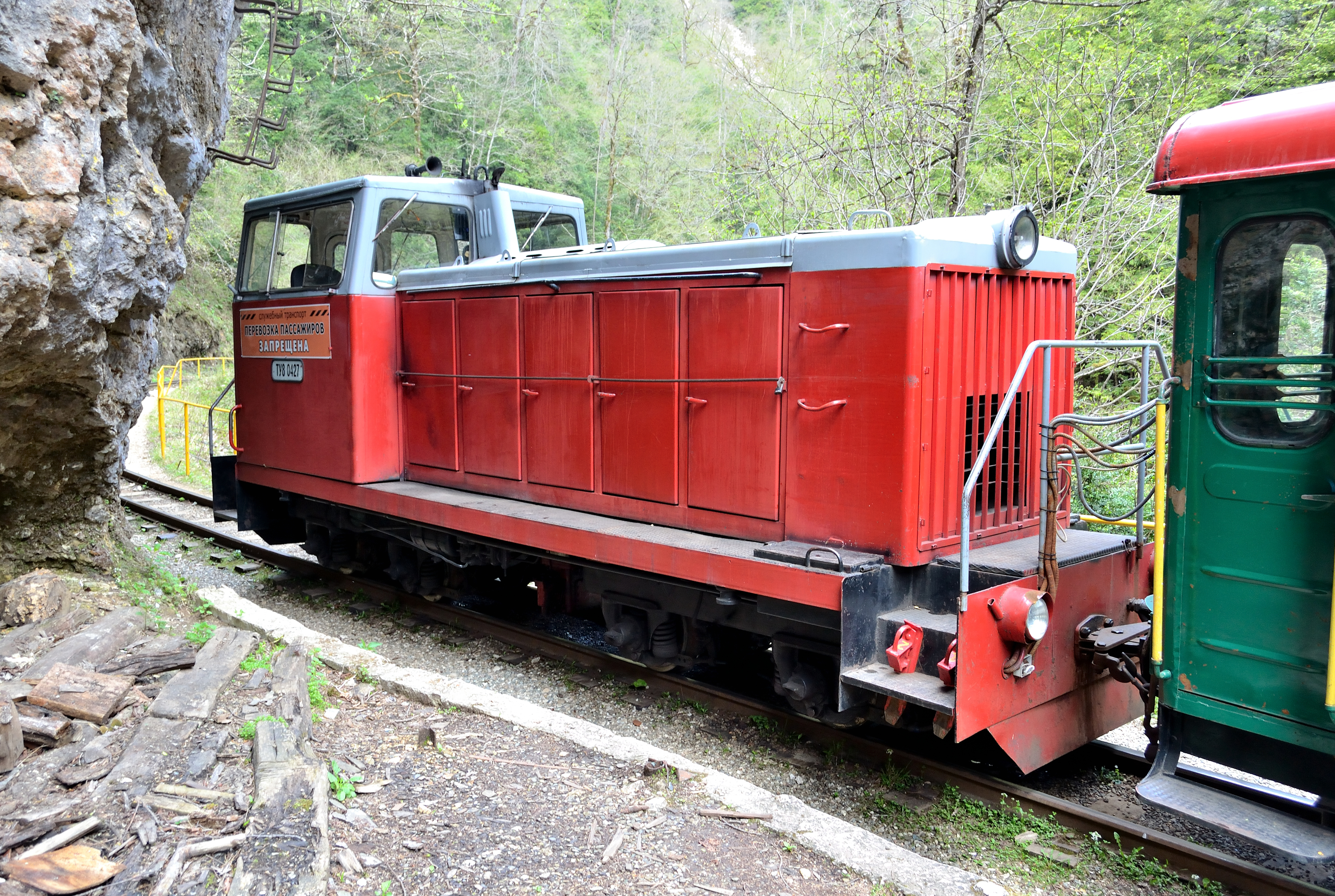
- TU8-0427, Apsheronsk narrow-gauge railway
Type and origin
- Power type: Diesel
- Builder: Kambarka Engineering Works
- Build date: 1988–present
Specifications
- Configuration
  - UIC: B'B'
- Gauge: 750 mm (2 ft 5 1/2 in) to 1,067 mm (3 ft 6 in)
- Wheel diameter: 600 mm (23.62 in)
- Minimum curve: 40 m (131.23 ft)
- Length: 8,525 mm (27 ft 11 5/8 in)
- Width: 2,300 mm (7 ft 6 1/2 in)
- Height: 3,495 mm (11 ft 5 5/8 in)
- Axle load: 4 t (3.9 long tons; 4.4 short tons)(?)
- Loco weight: 16 t (15.7 long tons; 17.6 short tons)
- Fuel type: Diesel
- Prime mover: ЯМЗ-236М
- Engine type: V-engine
- Transmission: mechanical
Performance figures
- Maximum speed: 50 km/h (31 mph)
- Power output: 180 hp
Career
- Class: RUS – ТУ8; Belarus – ТУ8; Vietnam – TY8 / ТУ8Э; Ukraine – ТУ8; Estonia – ТУ8; Latvia – ТУ8; Lithuania – ТУ8

TU8 (ТУ8) – Soviet, later Russian diesel locomotive for gauge 750 mm (2 ft 5 1/2 in).

== History ==
Diesel locomotive TU8 (ТУ8) is used for transportation & shunting services on narrow-gauge railways with a track gauge ranging from 750 mm (2 ft 5 1/2 in) to 1,067 mm (3 ft 6 in). The TU8 was developed in 1987 – 1988 at the Kambarka Engineering Works to replace the ageing locomotive classes TU6A (ТУ6А). The cab is equipped with efficient heat-system, refrigerator, radio-set and air conditioning.

== Series locomotives ==
The diesel locomotive TU8 (ТУ8) has been used as the basis of three other locomotives:

- TU8G (ТУ8Г)
- TU8P (ТУ8П)
- TU6SPA (ТУ6СПА) mobile power station

== Additional specifications ==
- Distance between bogies – 4,000 mm
- Base of bogies – 1,400 mm

== Gallery ==
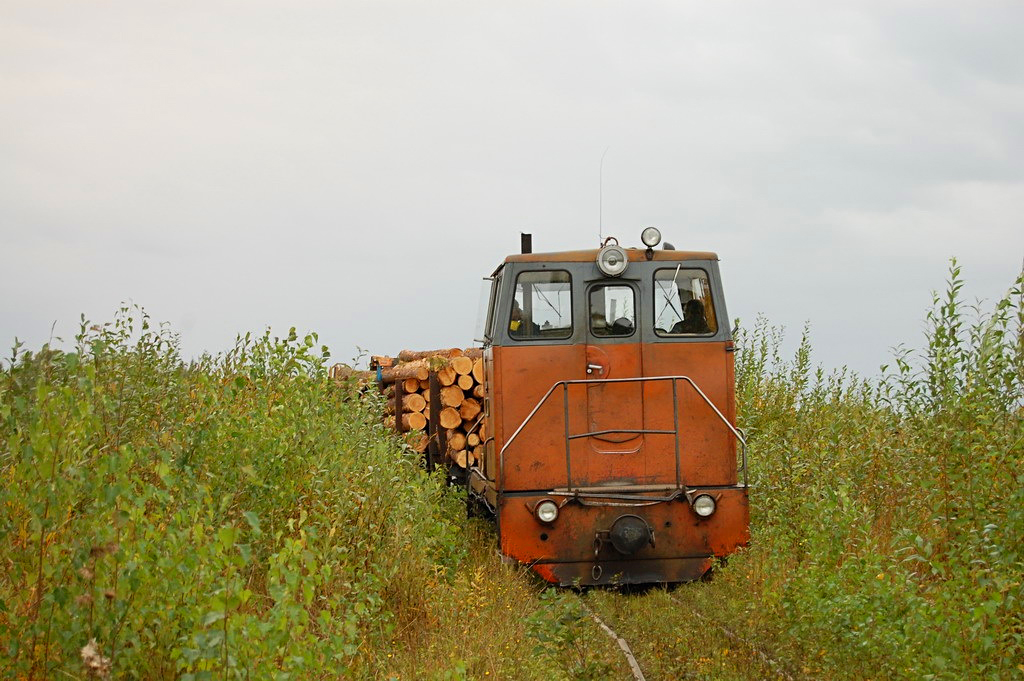
TU8, Udimskaya narrow-gauge railway

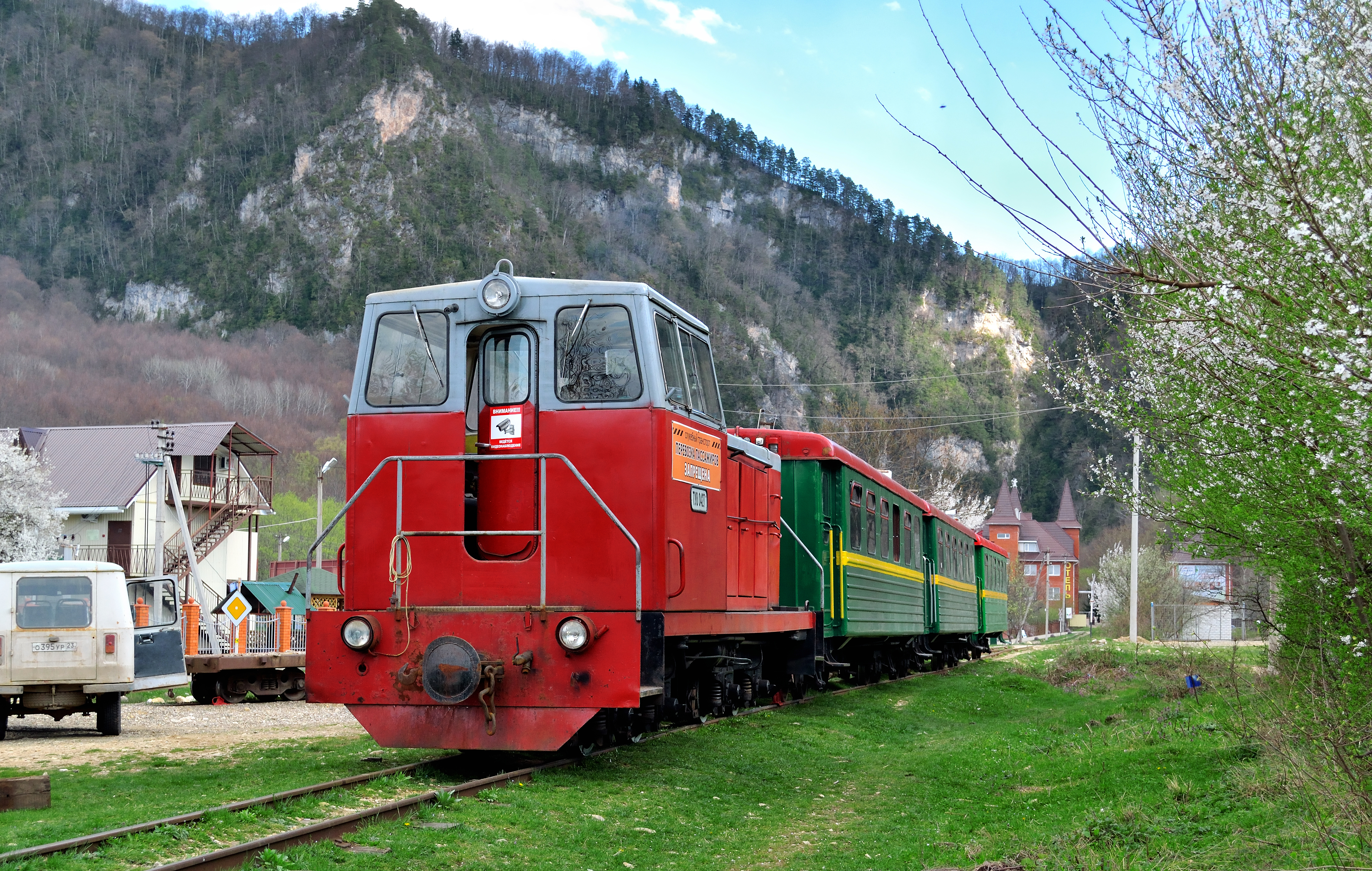
TU8-0427, Apsheronsk narrow-gauge railway

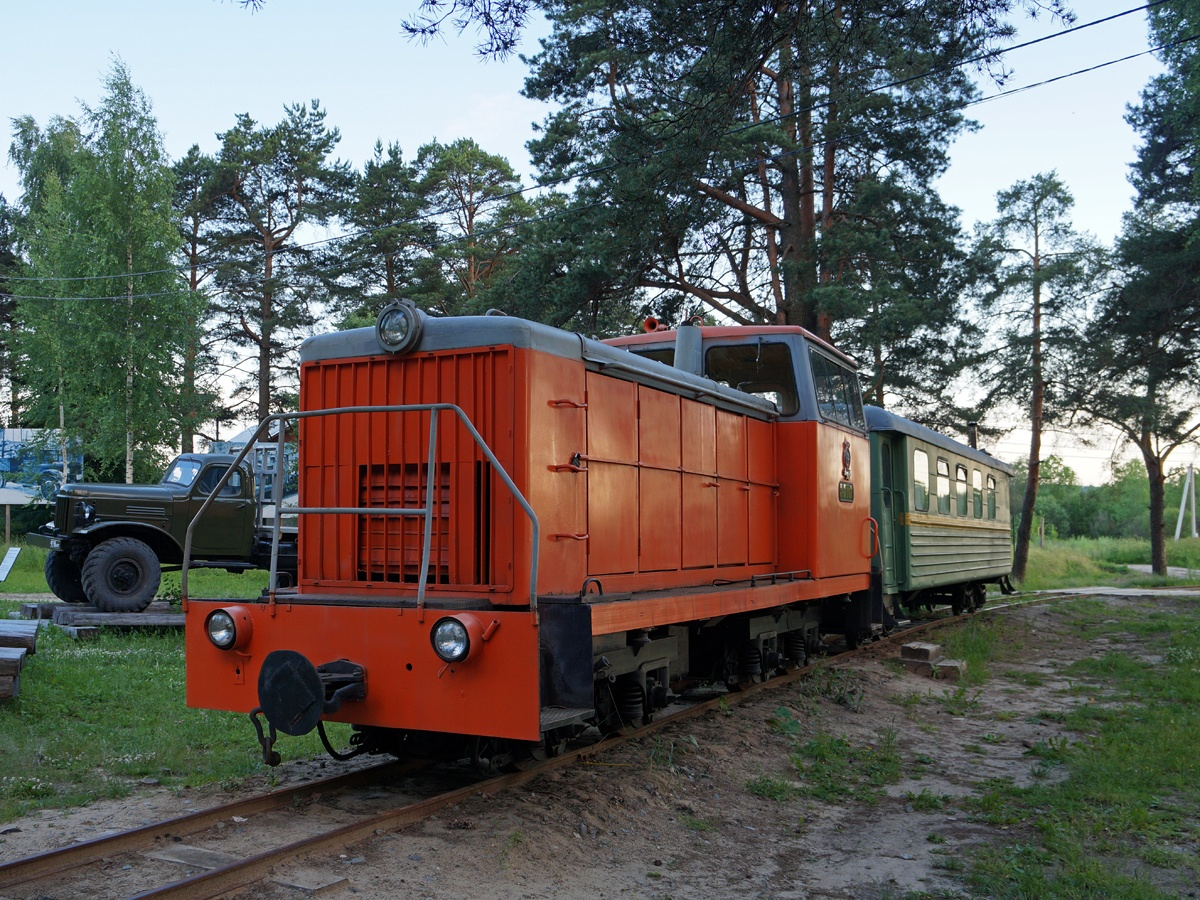
TU8-0167, Sharya Forest Museum Railway

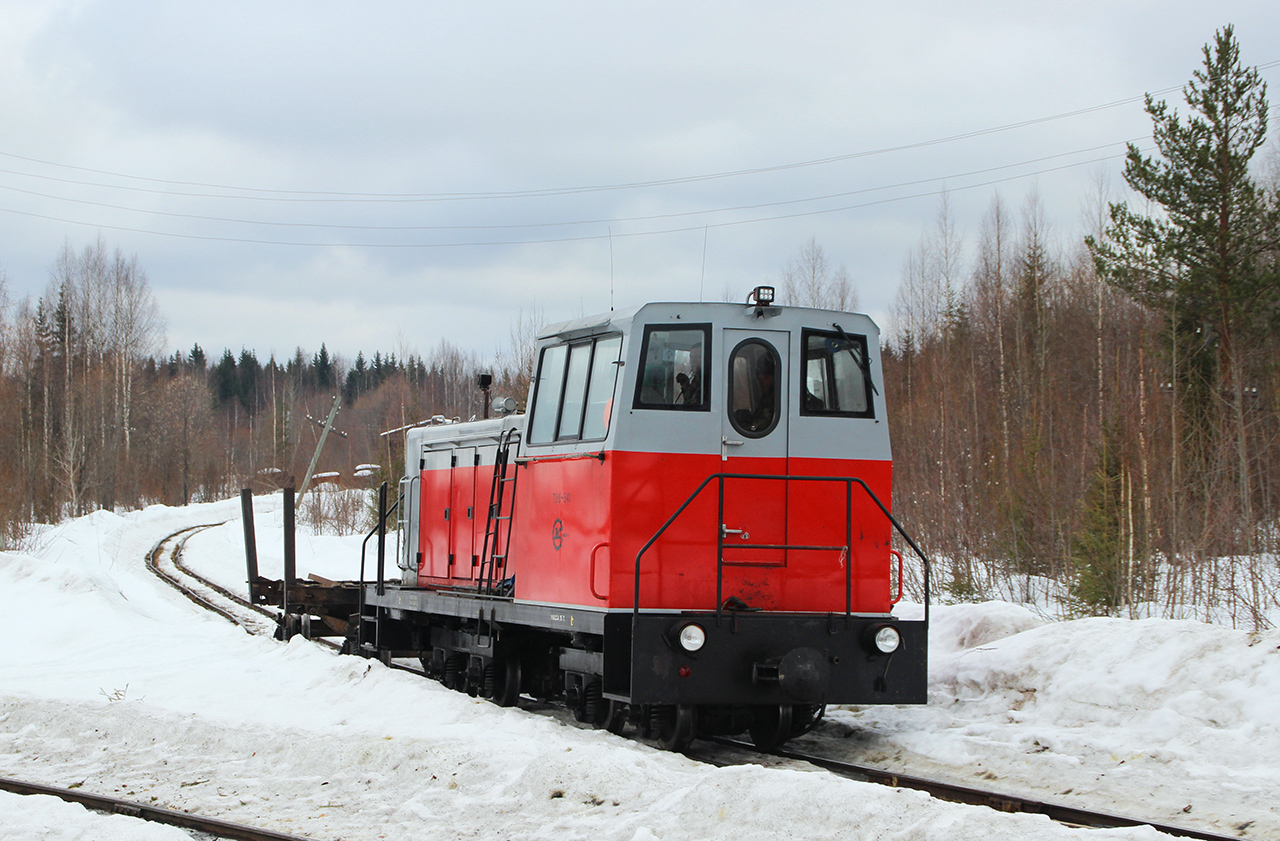
TU8-0541, Loyginskaya narrow gauge railway

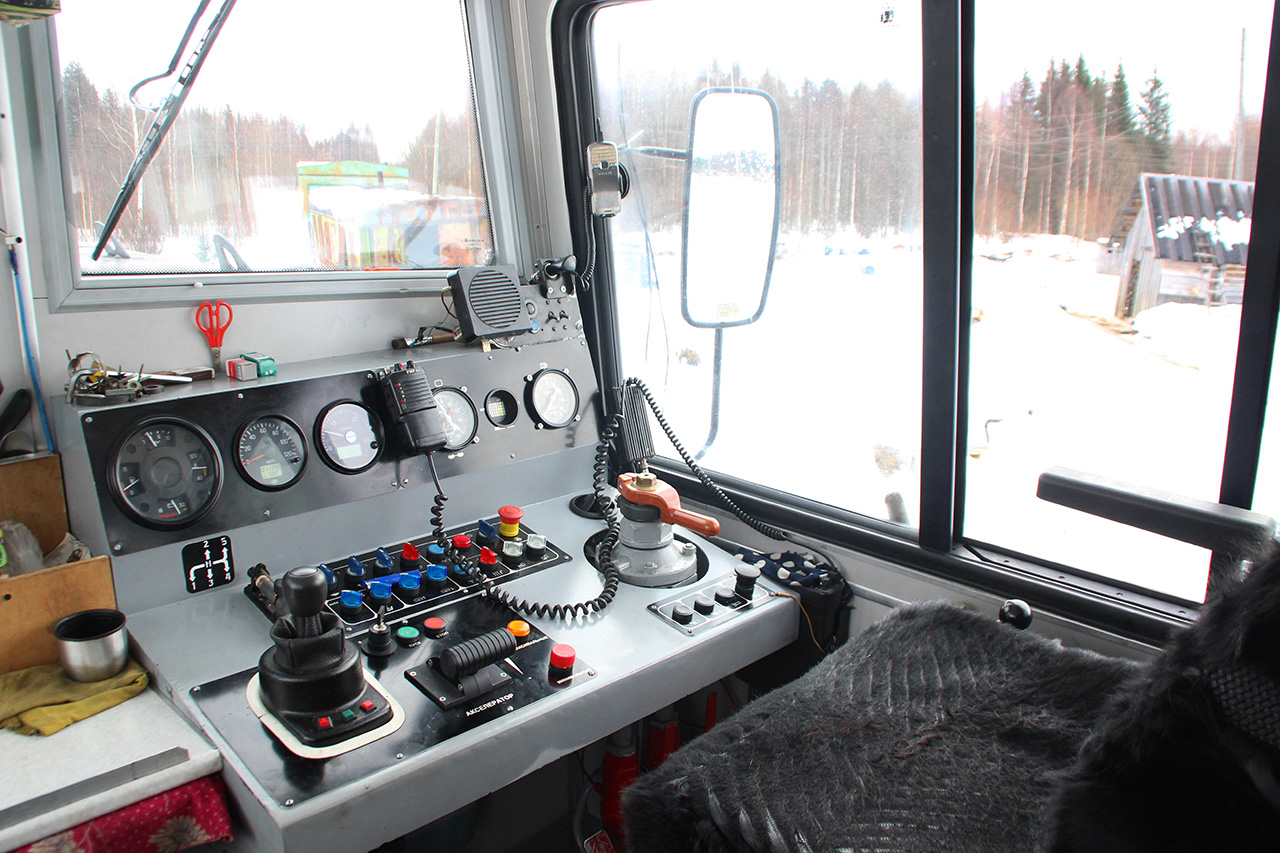
TU8-0541, Loyginskaya narrow-gauge railway

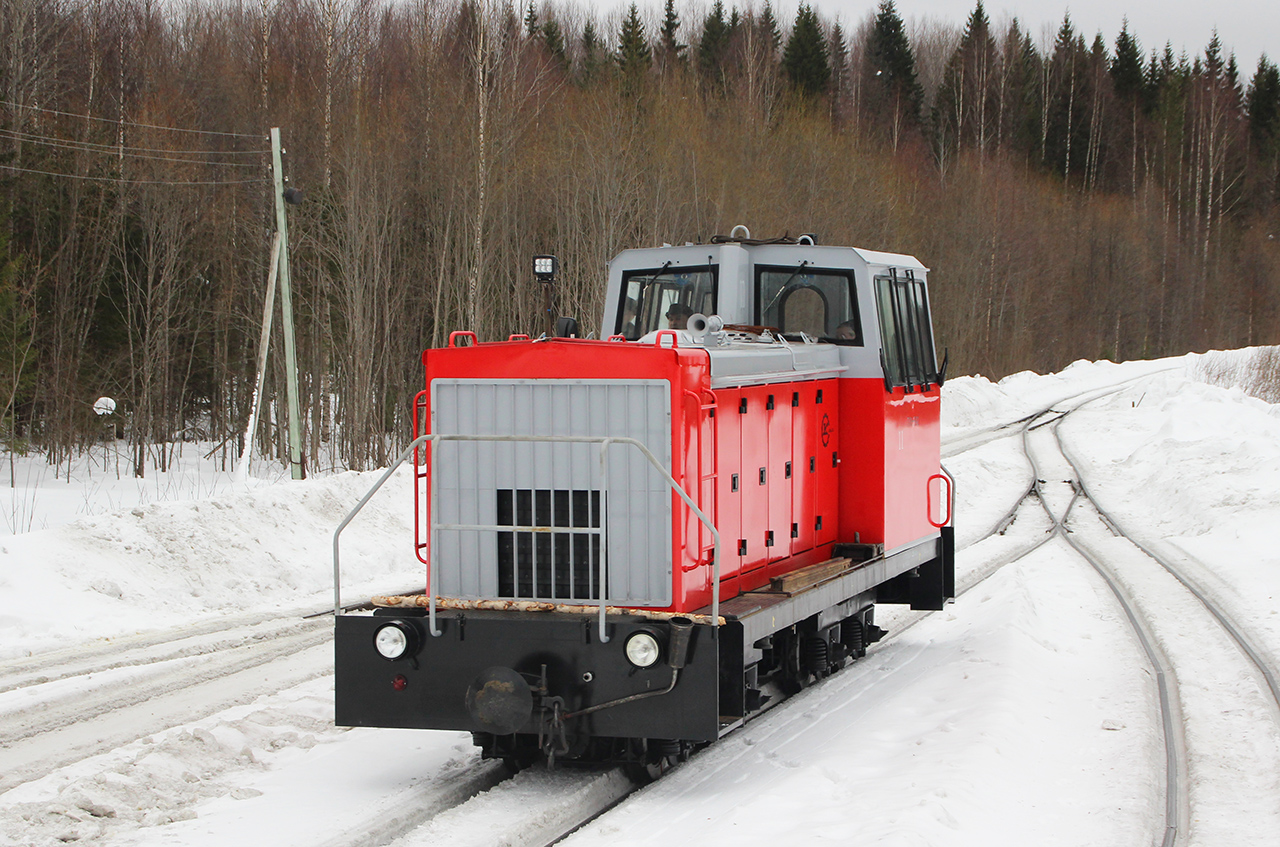
TU8-0542, Loyginskaya narrow-gauge railway

== See also ==
- Kambarka Engineering Works
