= Kambarka Engineering Works =

Rolling stock manufacturer

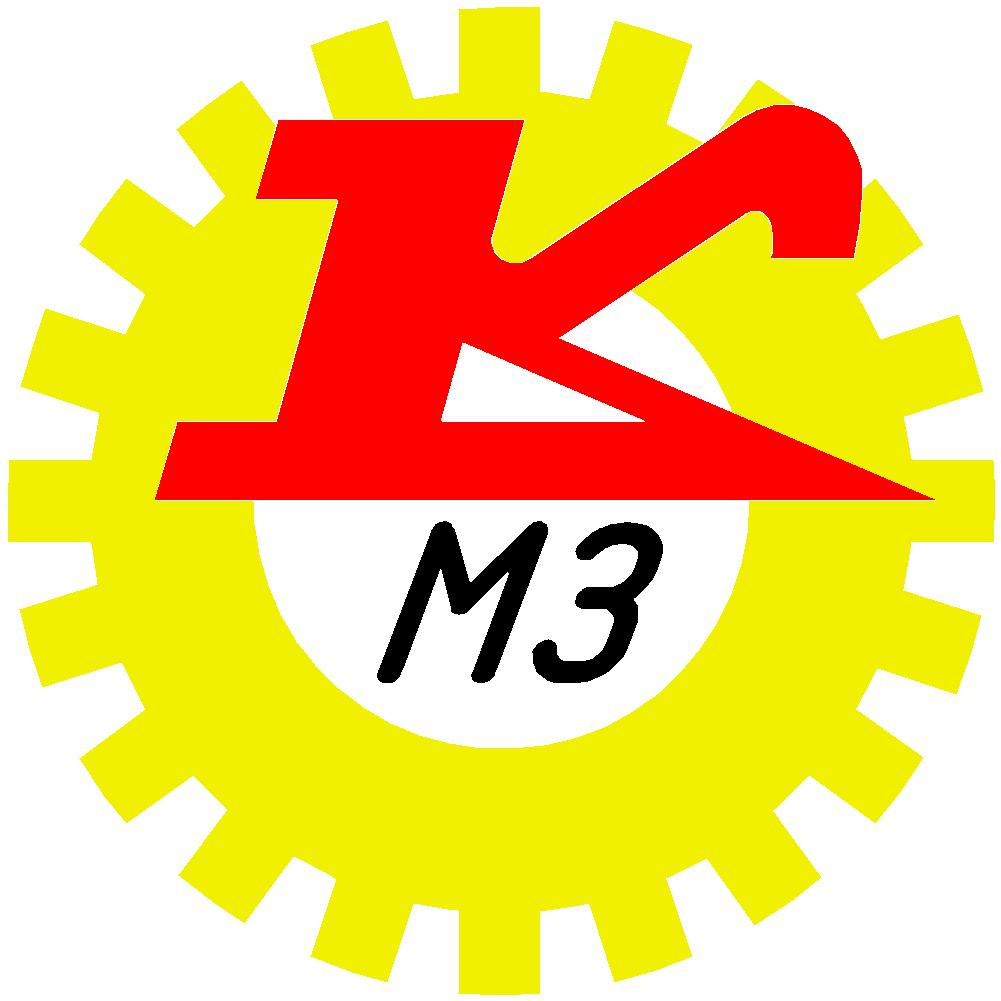

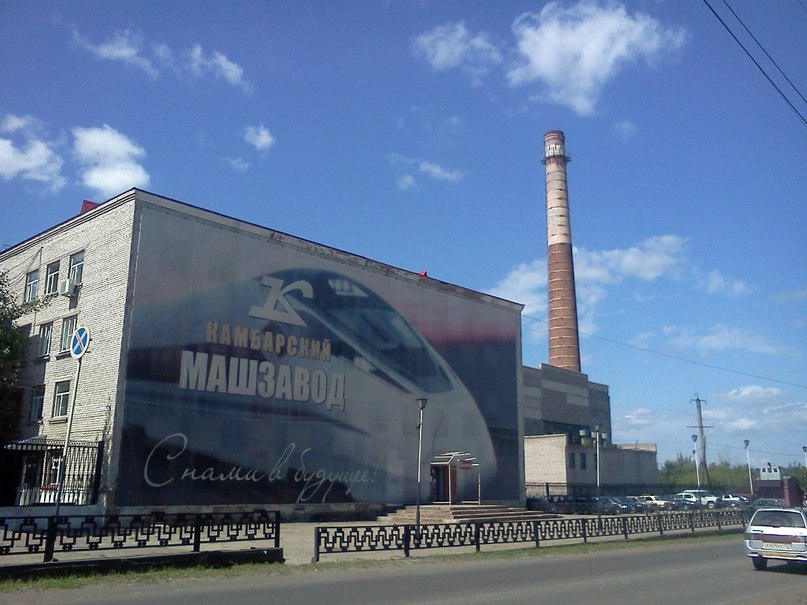
- Company Plant office in Kambarka, Udmurtia
- Type: PLC
- Industry: Rail vehicle manufacturing
- Founded: 1767
- Headquarters: Kambarka, Udmurtia, Russia
- Products: Locomotives and rolling stock
- Website: www.zavod-kmz.ru

Kambarka Engineering Works - Full name: Open Joint Stock Company «Kambarka Engineering Works» (Russian: КМЗ or Камбарский машиностроительный завод; Udmurt: Камбар машина лэсьтонъя завод). A rolling stock manufacturer, located in the city of Kambarka (Udmurt), Russia.

== History of the factory ==
Construction of an iron work started in 1761 and opened in 1767. The foundry produced up to 60,000 tons of iron per year. In 1950 the company shifted its focus towards railway technology.

=== Products ===
The companies product range consists of rolling stock, work trains for track maintenance and spare parts, primarily for narrow gauge railways with the track gauge between 750 mm (2 ft 5 1/2 in) and 1,067 mm (3 ft 6 in) - 1,520 mm (4 ft 11 27/32 in). Produced for: Russia, Estonia, Latvia, Lithuania, Ukraine, Belarus, Poland, Bulgaria, Slovakia, Argentina, Vietnam, Cambodia, Cuba, Mali, Nicaragua, Uzbekistan, Guinea-Bissau.

== Main products ==
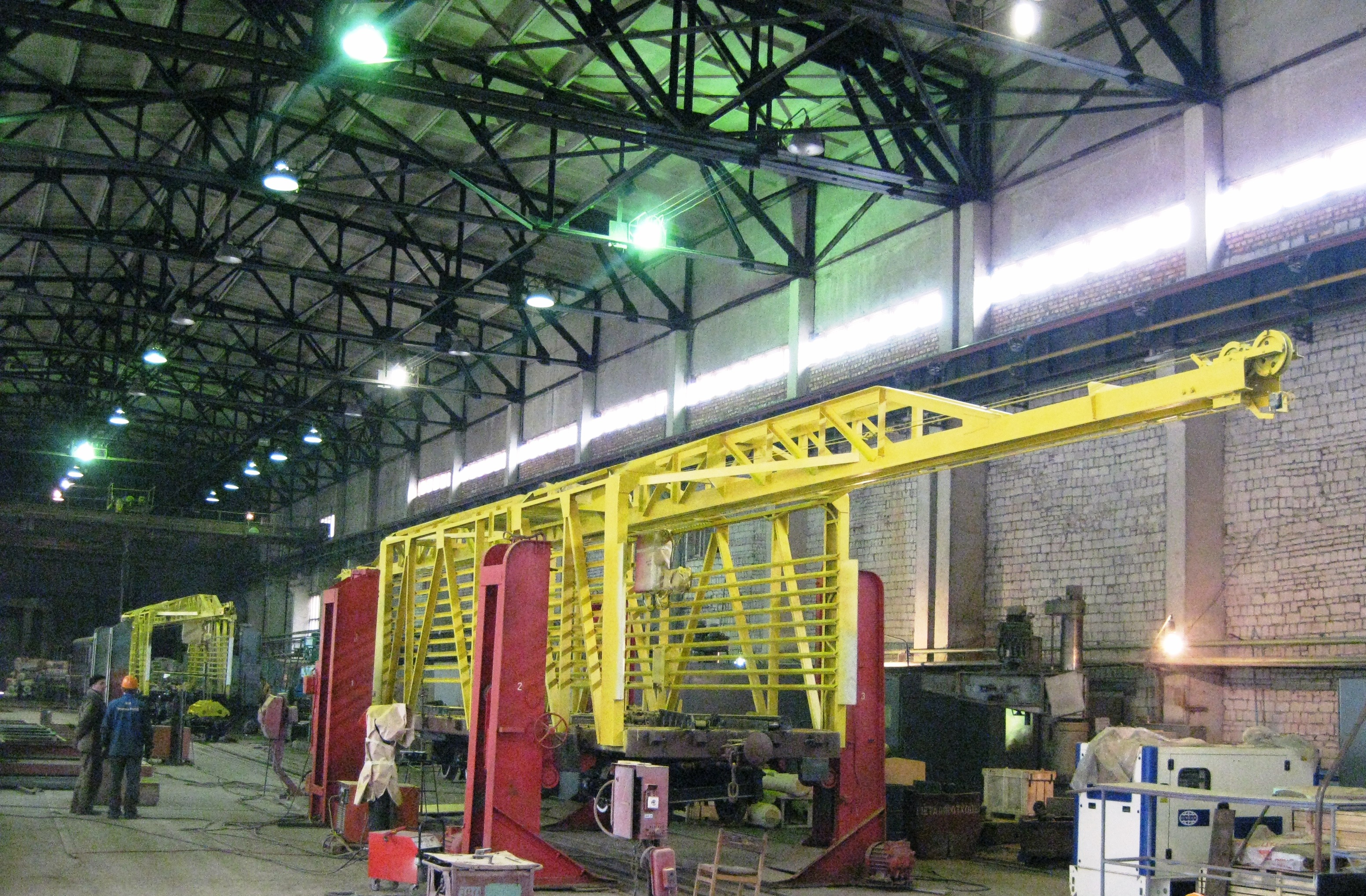
Interior of plant workshop, 2011

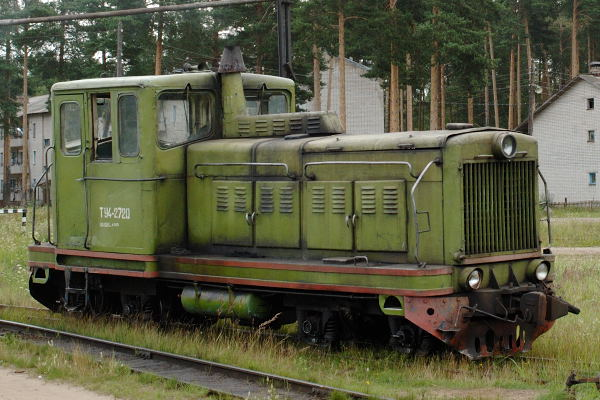
TU4 (1961–1972)

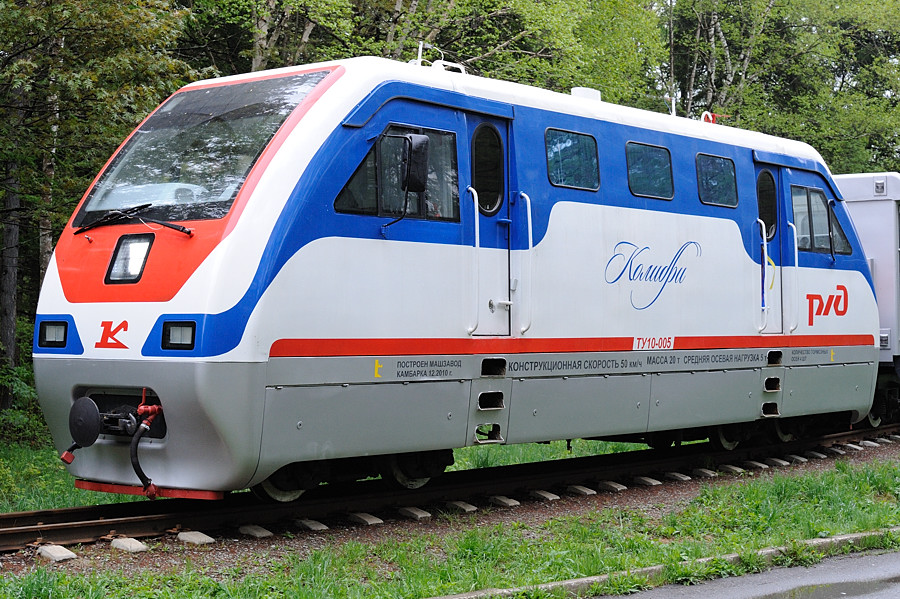
TU10 for Children's railway

=== Diesel locomotives ===
- TU4 (1961–1972)
- TU5 (1967–1973)
- TU6 (1968–1971)
- TU6A (1973–1988)
- TU6SPA (1980 - 1993 - today)
- TU7 (1970 - 1986)
- TU7A (1986 - 2009 - today)
- TU8G (1988 - today)
- TU8P (1988 - today)
- TU8 (1988 - today)
- TU10 (2010 - today)
- TGM40 (1,520 mm or 4 ft 11 27/32 in and
  1,435 mm or 4 ft 8 1/2 in standard gauge, 1982 - today)
- TU7 - 1698 Track gauge now 603mm/1ft 11.75in - running on Brecon Mountain Railway in South Wales today on preservation line/tourist attraction

=== Passenger cars ===
- Passenger car
- Sleeping car
- Hospital car
- Dining car (also executive)
- Railway post office

=== Railroad freight cars ===
- Open wagon for peat
- Side-tipping wagon
- Hopper car
- Tank car
- Flatcar

=== Other ===
- Mobile power stations - TU6SPA
- Railway crane
- Work train
- Snowplow
- LD24

=== Gallery of products ===
Products of the Kambarka Engineering Works

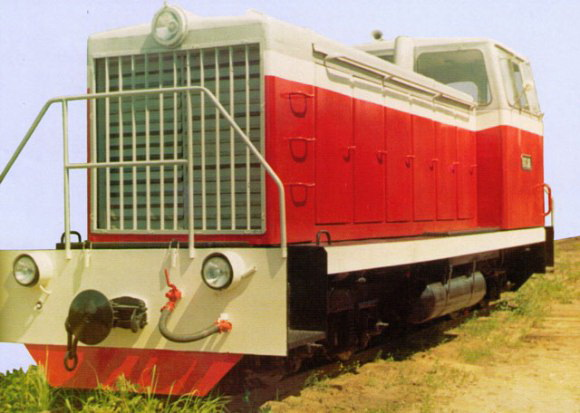
TU7

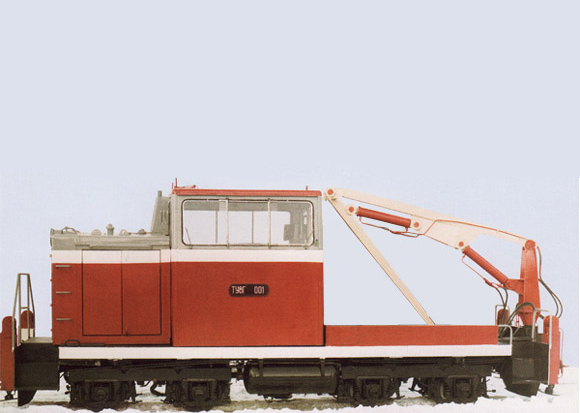
TU8G

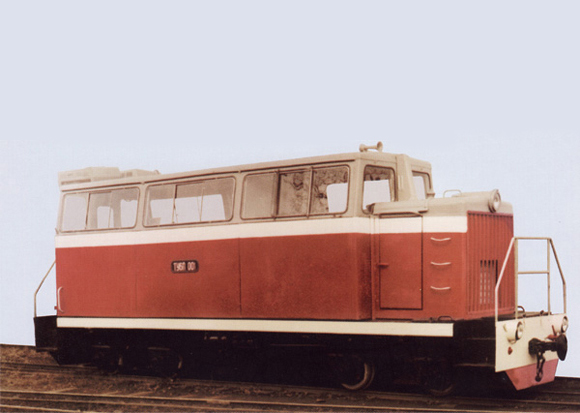
TU8P

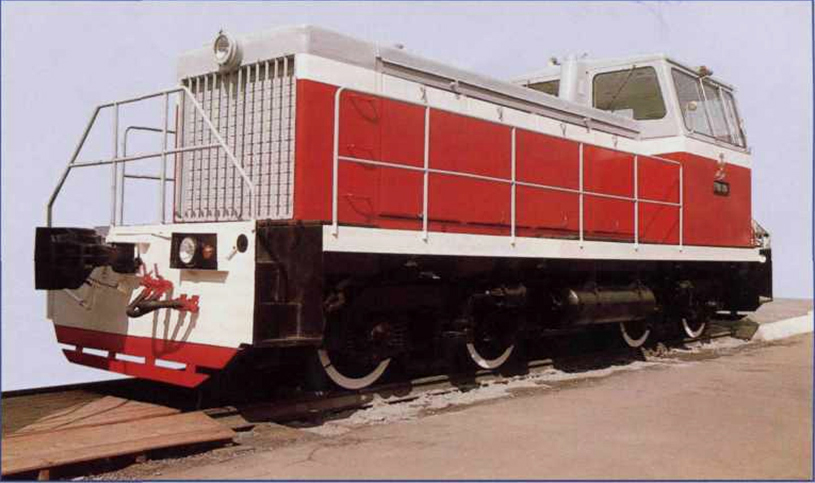
TGM40

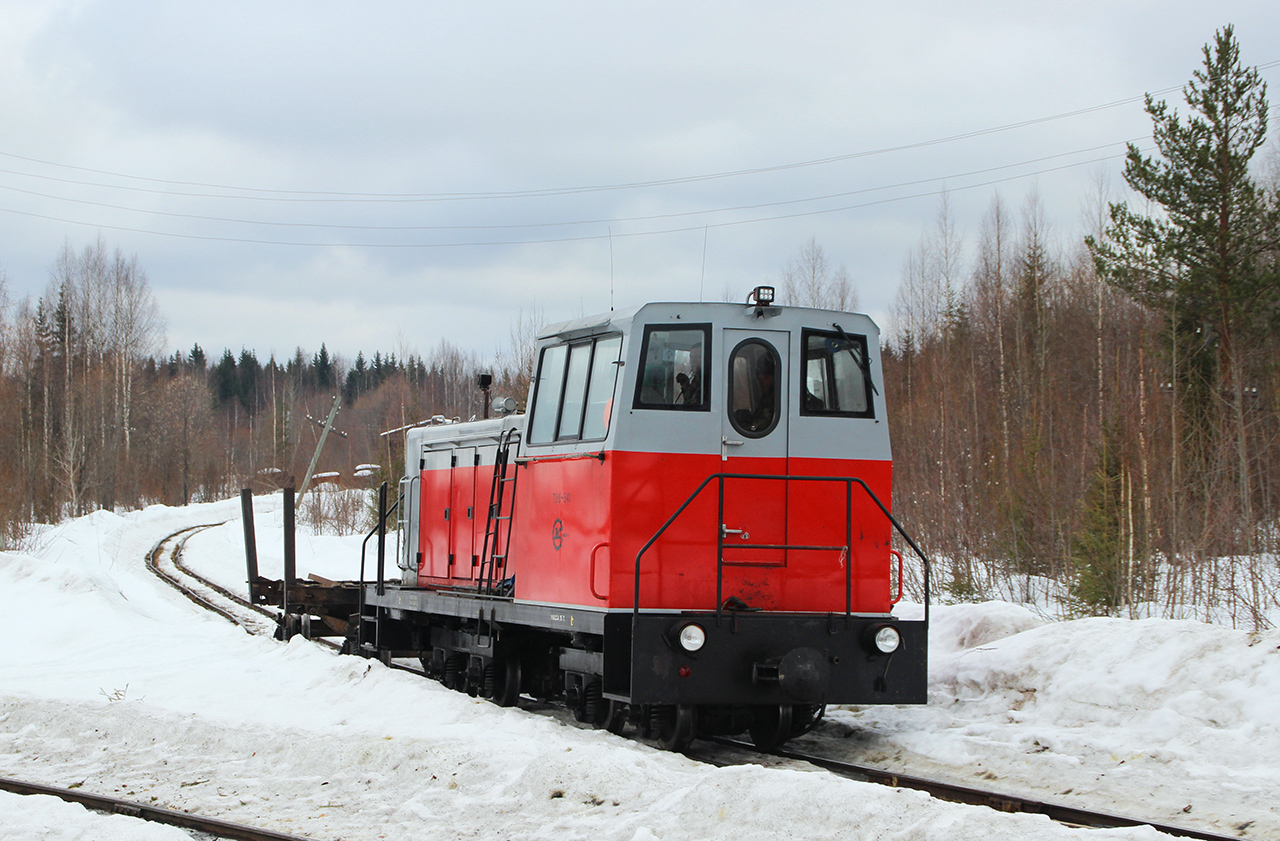
New Generation TU8

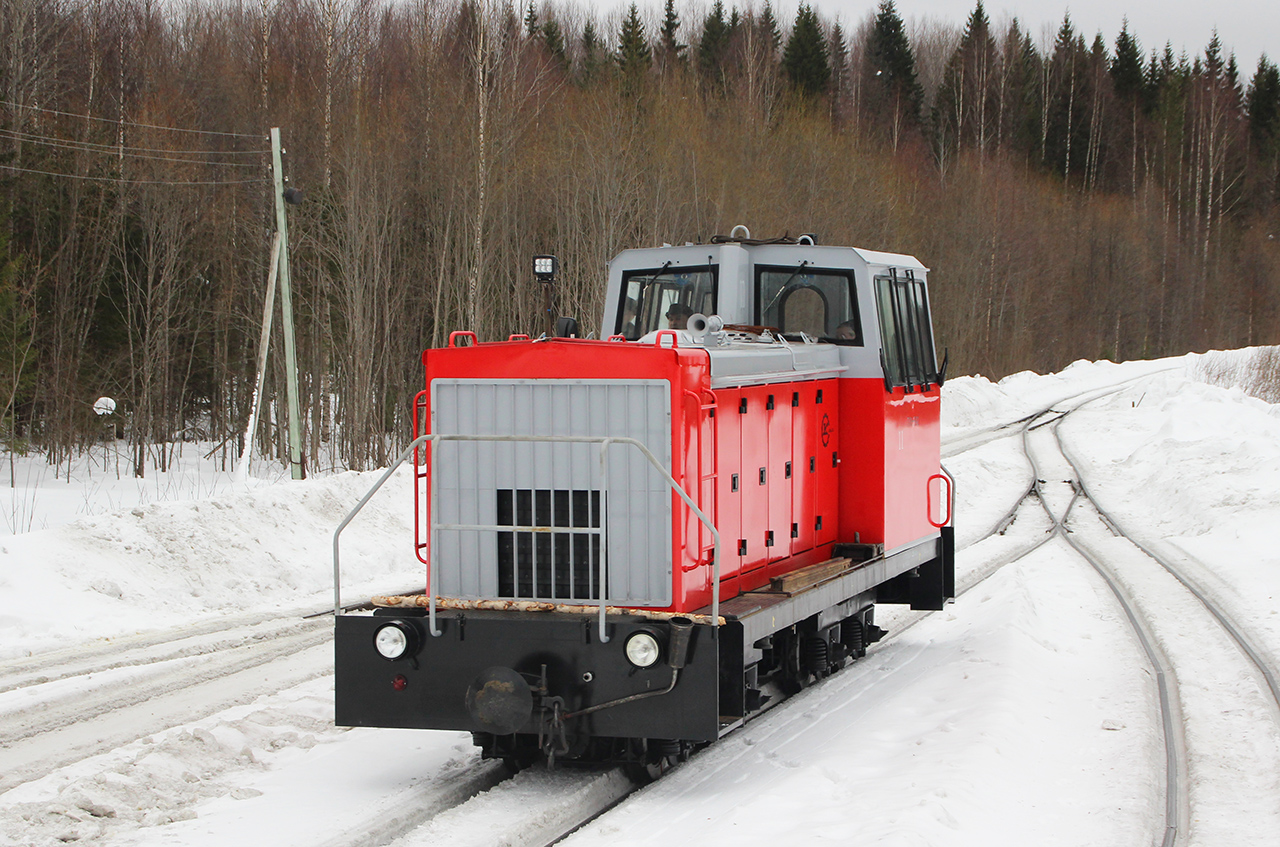
New Generation TU8

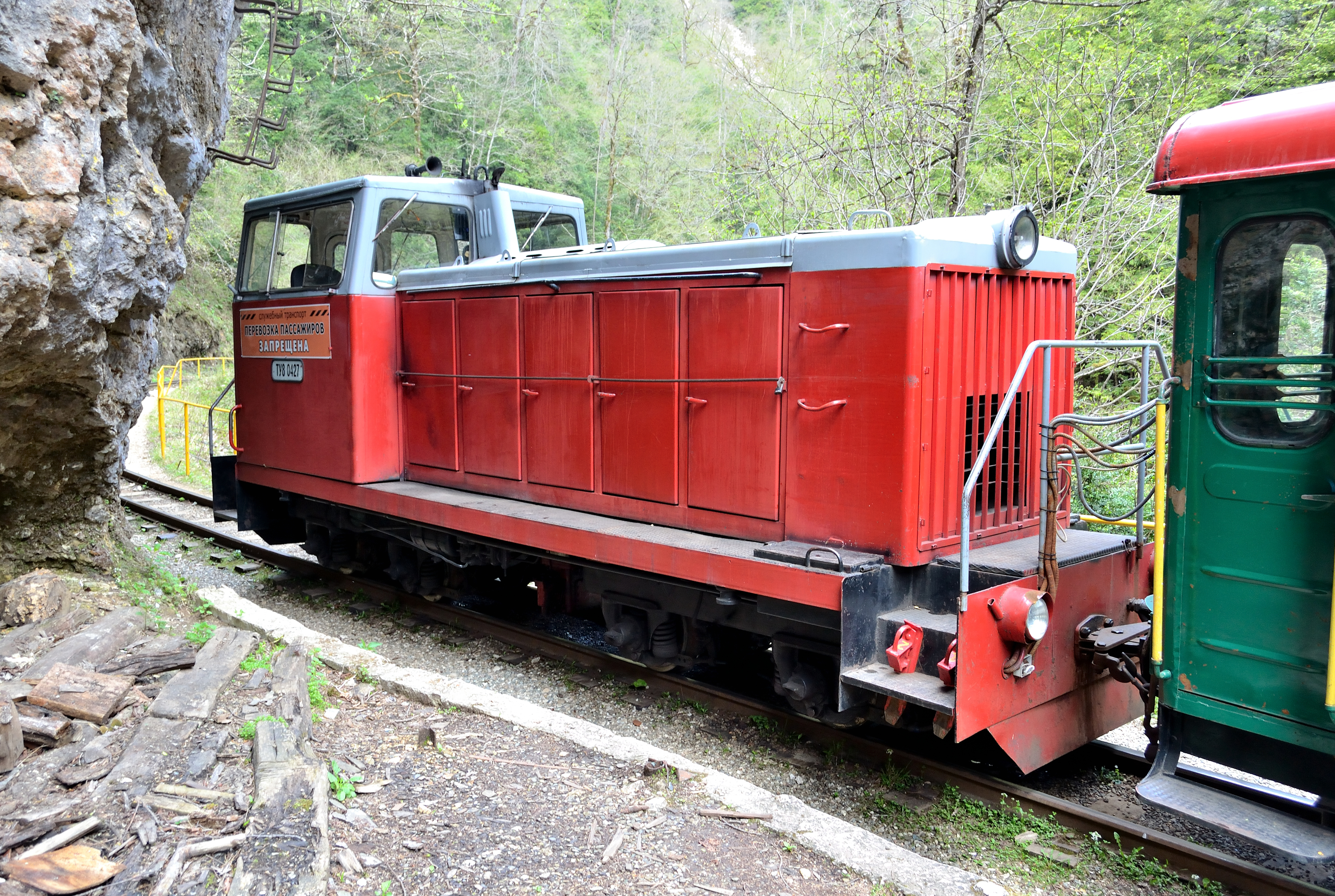
TU8

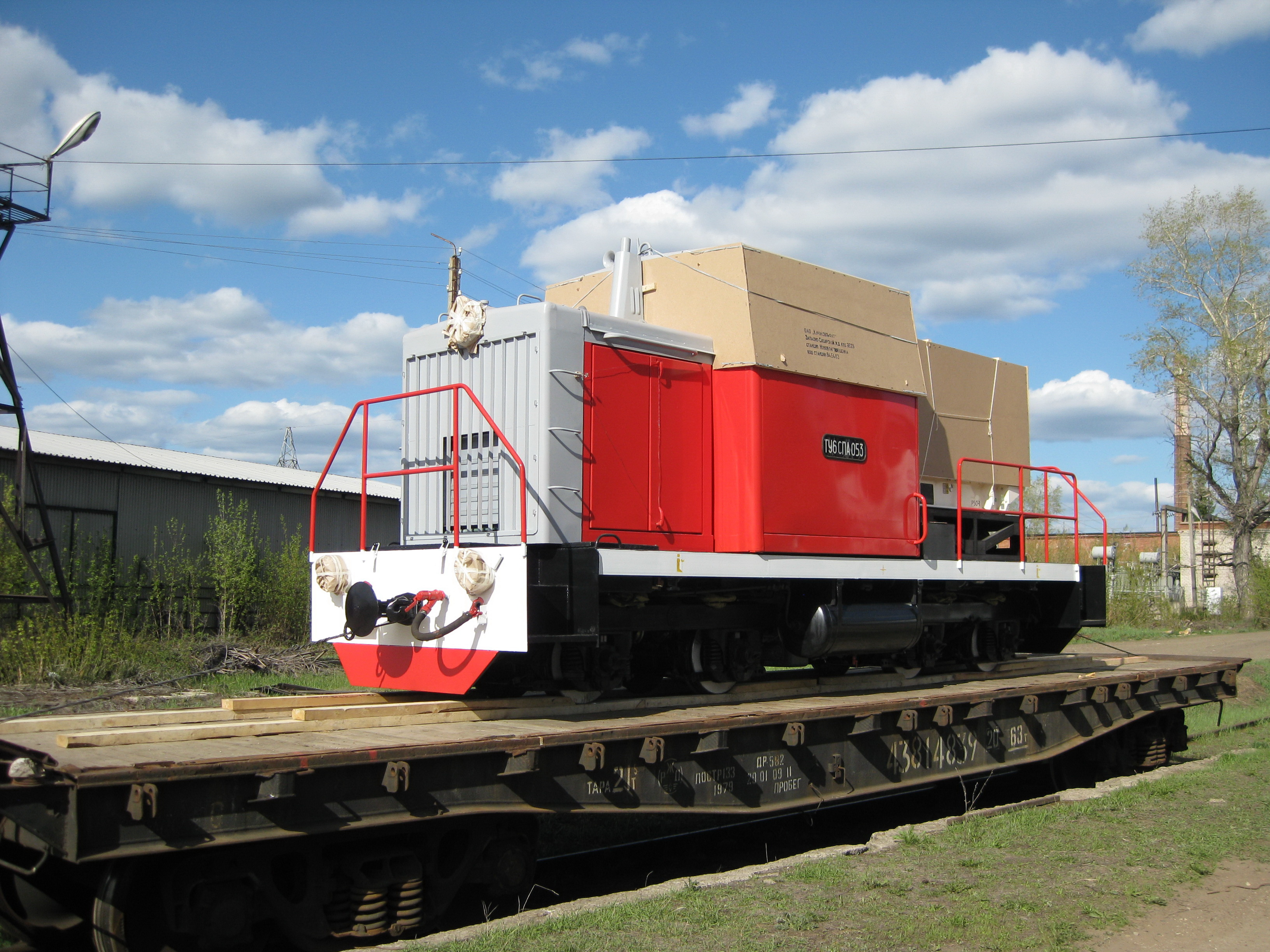
TU6SPA

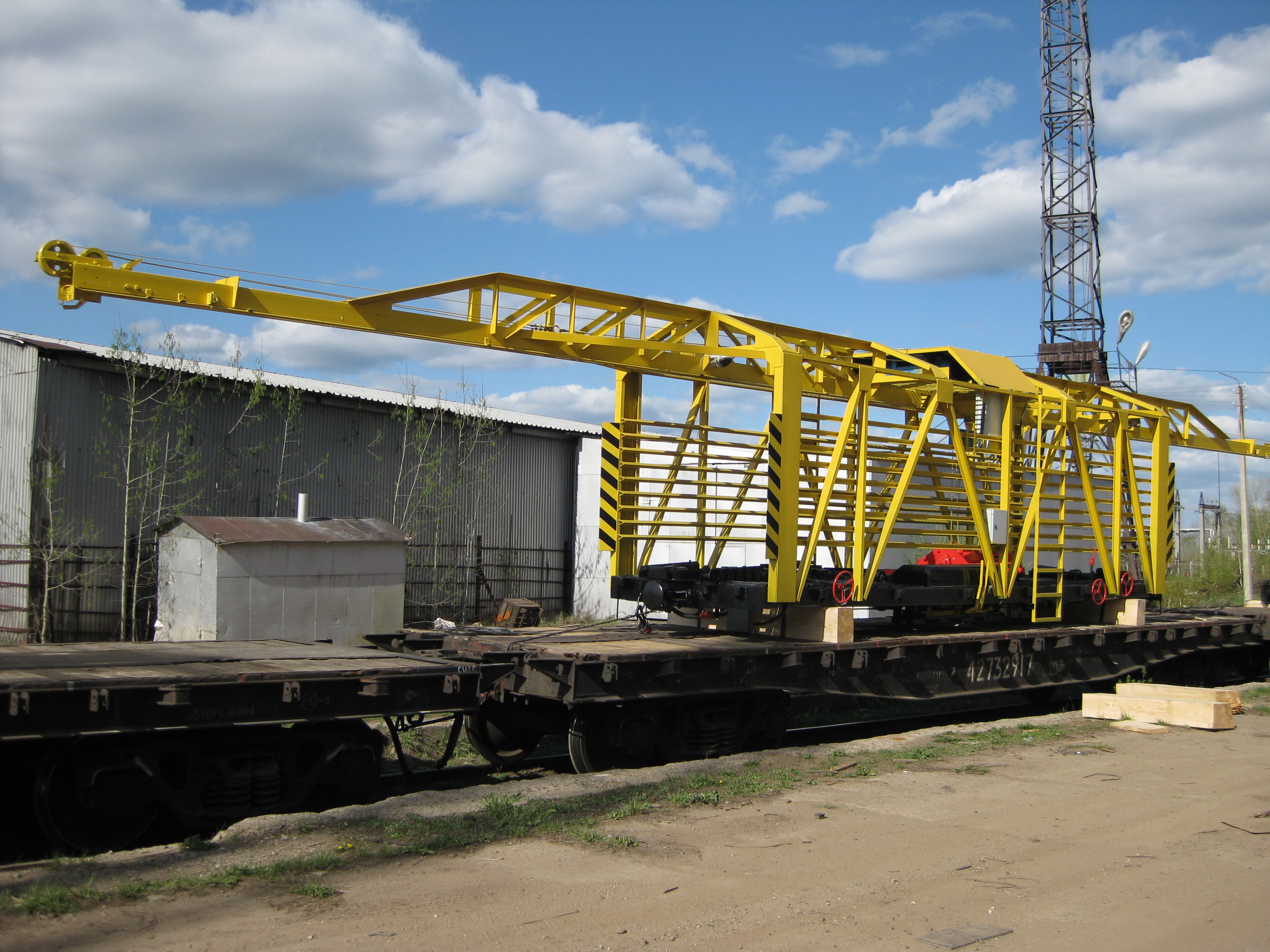
Railway crane SPA Cran

Open wagon for peat TSV6A

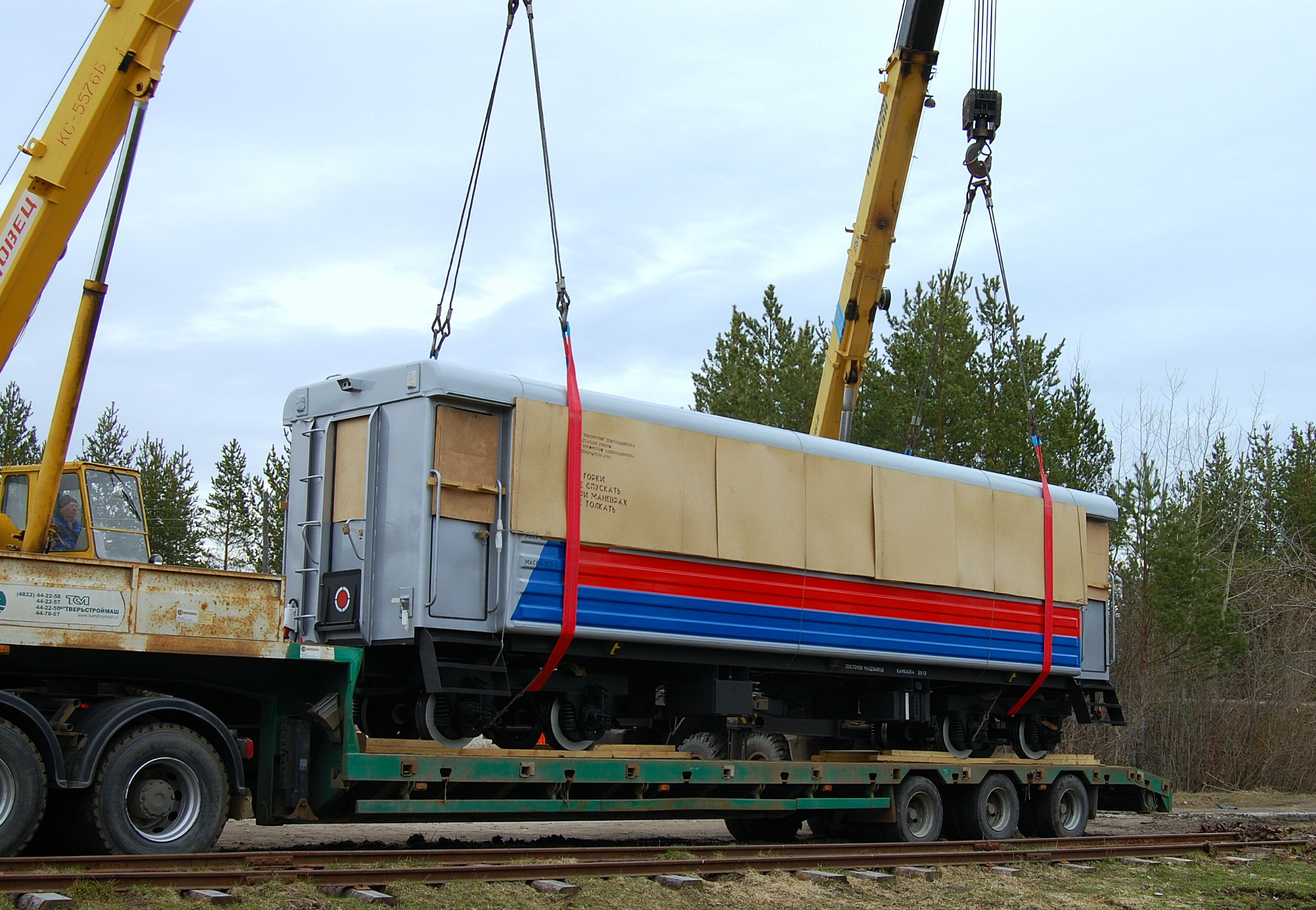
Passenger car

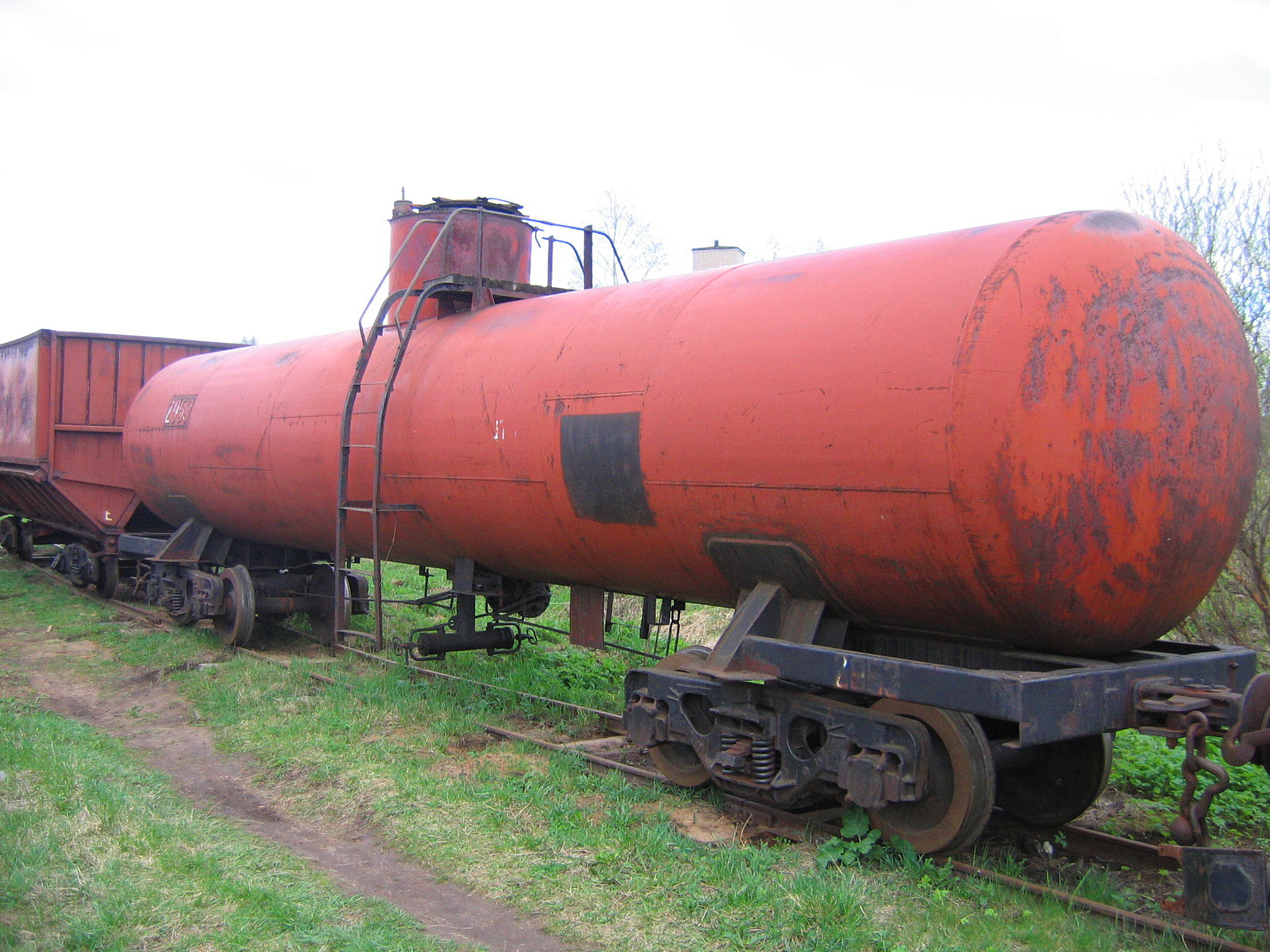
Tank car, 750 mm (2 ft 5 1/2 in) gauge

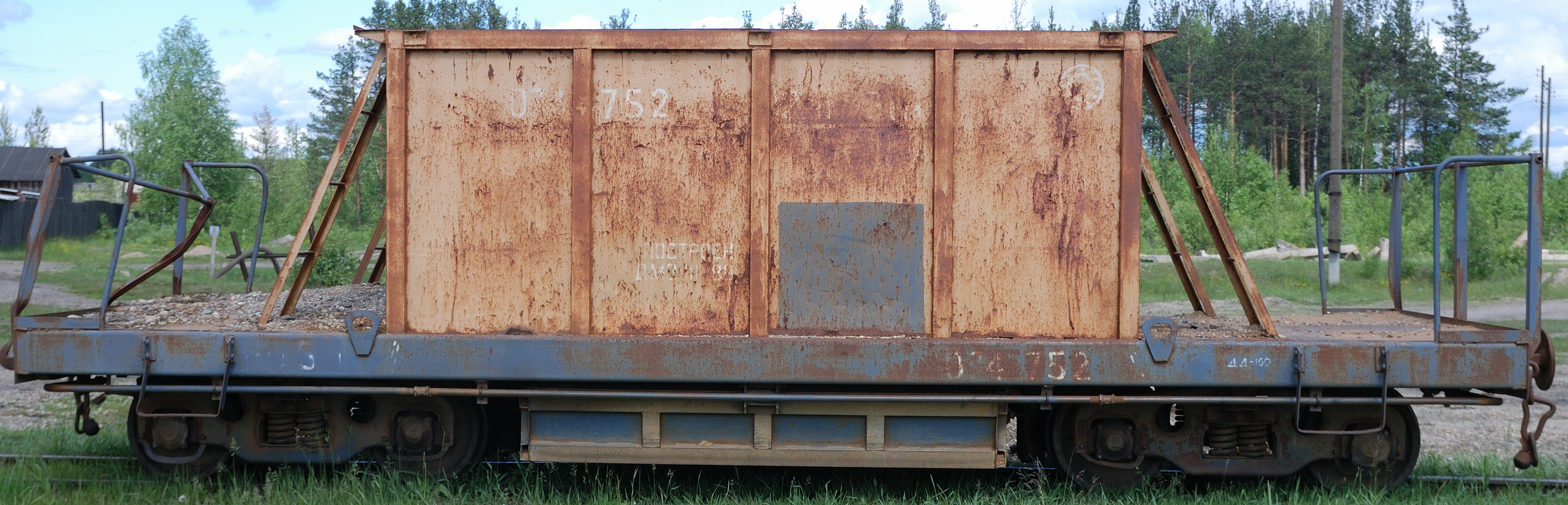
Hopper car for track ballast, 750 mm (2 ft 5 1/2 in) gauge

== See also ==
- Narrow gauge railways
- Narrow gauge railways in Russia
