= TU6 diesel locomotive =

TU6
- TU6A - Peat railway
Type and origin
- Power type: Diesel
- Builder: Kambarka Engineering Works
- Build date: 1973–1988
- Total produced: 3,915
Specifications
- Configuration
  - UIC: B'B'
- Gauge: 750 mm (2 ft 5 1/2 in); 1,067 mm (3 ft 6 in)
- Wheel diameter: 600 mm (23.62 in)
- Minimum curve: 40 m (131.23 ft)
- Length: 8,490 mm (334 1/4 in)
- Width: 2,550 mm (100 3/8 in)
- Height: 3,515 mm (138 3/8 in)
- Axle load: 3.5 t (3.4 long tons; 3.9 short tons)
- Loco weight: 14 t (14 long tons; 15 short tons)(?)
- Fuel type: Diesel
- Prime mover: ЯАЗ-204А
- Transmission: mechanical
Performance figures
- Maximum speed: 50 km/h (31 mph)
- Power output: 127 hp (95 kW)
Career
- Class: RUS - ТУ6А; Latvia - ТУ6А; Estonia - ТУ6А; Belarus - ТУ6А; Ukraine - ТУ6А; Lithuania - ТУ6А

TU6 (ТУ6) is a Soviet narrow gauge diesel locomotive for the track gauge of 750 mm (2 ft 5 1/2 in).

== History ==
The first TU6A was built in 1973 at the Kambarka Engineering Works. 3,915 TU6A locomotives were produced until 1988. The locomotives were used on many narrow gauge railways to move cargo as well as passenger trains. The cab is equipped with efficient heat-system, radio-set and air conditioning.

=== Series locomotives ===
The diesel locomotive TU6A (ТУ6А) has been used as the basis of three other locomotives:

- TU6P (ТУ6П)
- TU6D (ТУ6Д)
- TU6SPA (ТУ6СПА) mobile power station
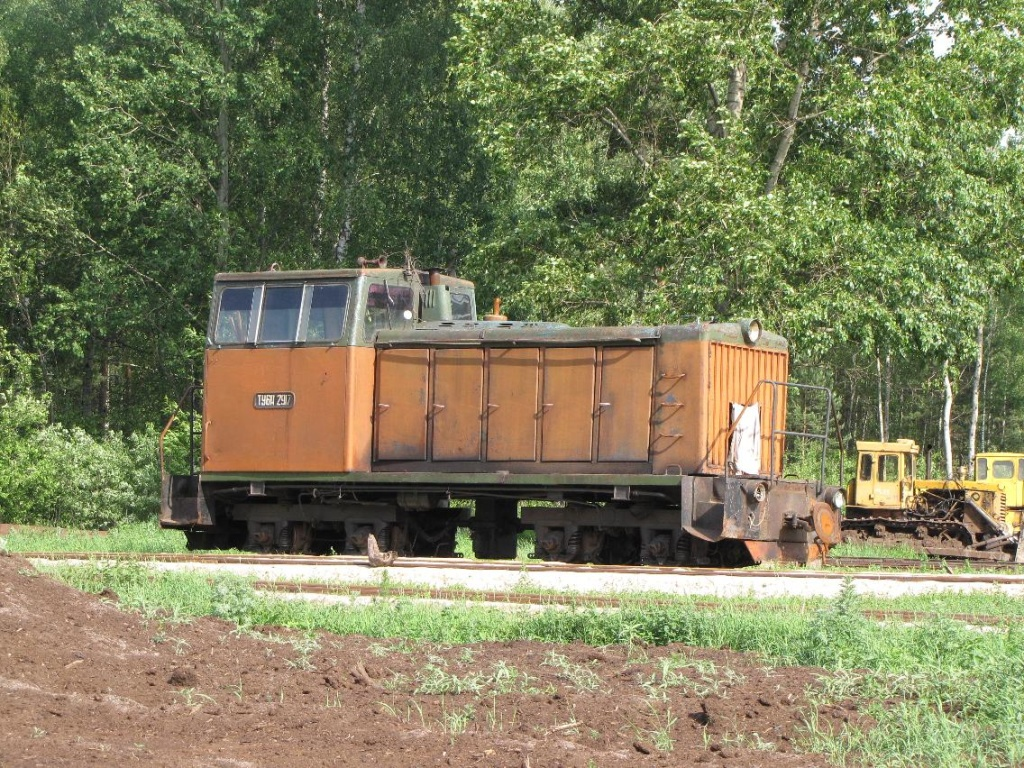
TU6A - 2917, Solotchinskoye railway

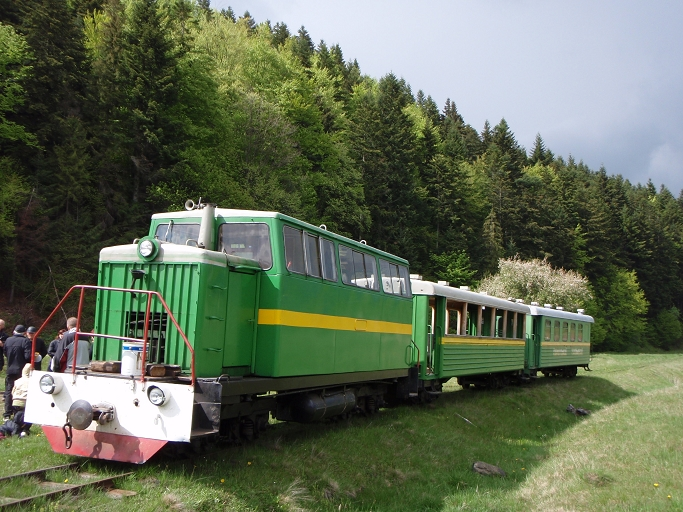
TU6P (ТУ6П), Ukraine

== See also ==
- Kambarka Engineering Works
- Narrow gauge railways
