= TU6SPA =

Soviet diesel locomotive

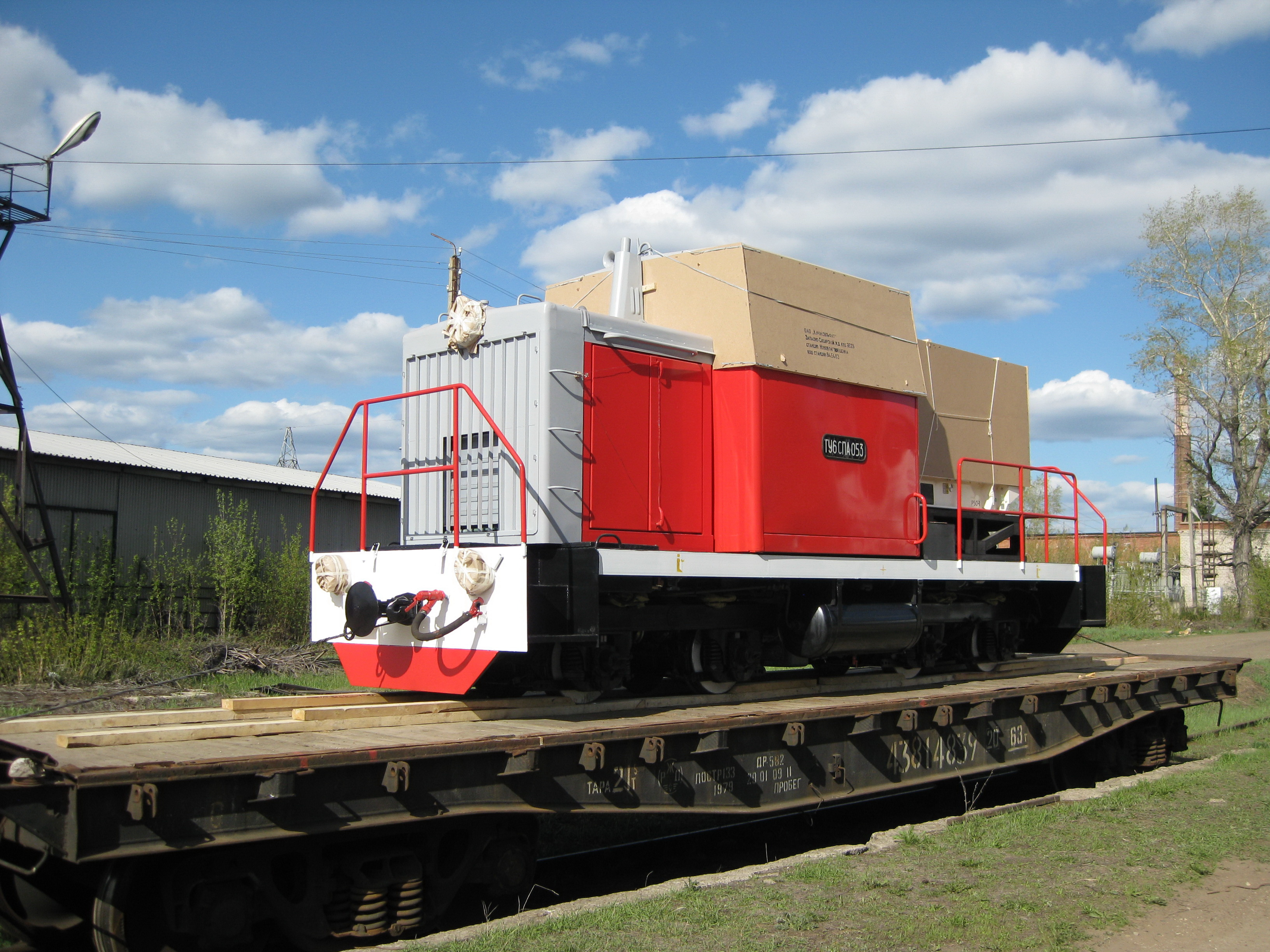
- Diesel locomotive - mobile power station
Type and origin
- Power type: Diesel
- Builder: Kambarka Engineering Works
- Build date: 1980 - 1993 - today
Specifications
- Configuration
  - UIC: B'B'
- Gauge: 750 mm (2 ft 5 1/2 in)
- Driver dia.: 600 mm (23.62 in)
- Minimum curve: 40 m (131.23 ft)
- Length: 9,010 mm (29 ft 6 3/4 in)
- Width: 2,550 mm (8 ft 4 3/8 in)
- Height: 3,495 mm (11 ft 5 5/8 in)
- Axle load: 4 t (3.9 long tons; 4.4 short tons)
- Loco weight: 16 t (15.7 long tons; 17.6 short tons)
- Fuel type: Diesel
- Prime mover: ЯМЗ-236М
- Engine type: V-shaped
- Transmission: mechanical
Performance figures
- Maximum speed: 50 kilometres per hour (31 mph)
- Power output: 180 hp (130 kW)
Career
- Class: RUS - TU6SPA / (ТУ6СПА); Belarus - TU6SPA / (ТУ6СПА); Ukraine - TU6SPA / (ТУ6СПА)

TU6SPA (ТУ6СПА) is a Soviet, later Russian diesel locomotive and mobile power station for 750 mm (2 ft 5 1/2 in) track gauge.

== History ==
Diesel locomotive TU6SPA (ТУ6СПА) is a sub-type of the TU8 diesel locomotive equipped with an electric generator used for energy supply to non self-propelled heavy-duty track machines. The TU6SPA was developed in 1987–1993 at the Kambarka Engineering Works to replace the aging locomotive classes TU6SRP (ТУ6СРП). The TU6SPA was designed to be used on any gauge from 750 mm (2 ft 5 1/2 in). The cab is equipped with efficient heat-system, refrigerator, radio-set and air conditioning.

== Additional specifications ==
- Electric generator
- Number of seats in the cabin – 6
- Distance between bogies – 4,000 mm (157.48 in)
- Base of bogies – 1,400 mm (55.12 in)

== See also ==
- Narrow gauge railways
- Kambarka Engineering Works
