= TU8G =

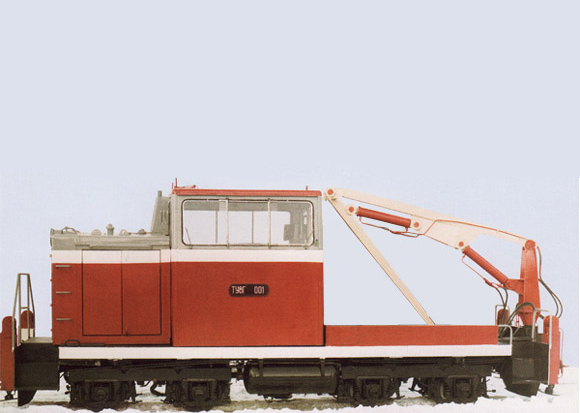
- Kambarka engineering plant, Russia
Type and origin
- Power type: Diesel
- Builder: Kambarka Engineering Works
- Build date: 1988 - today
Specifications
- Configuration
  - UIC: B'B'
- Gauge: 750 mm (2 ft 5 1/2 in) to 1,067 mm (3 ft 6 in)
- Wheel diameter: 600 mm (23.62 in)
- Minimum curve: 40 m (131.23 ft)
- Length: 9,010 mm (29 ft 6 3/4 in)
- Width: 2,550 mm (8 ft 4 3/8 in)
- Height: 3,495 mm (11 ft 5 5/8 in)
- Axle load: 4 t (3.9 long tons; 4.4 short tons)(?)
- Loco weight: 16 t (15.7 long tons; 17.6 short tons)
- Fuel type: Diesel
- Prime mover: ЯМЗ-236М
- Engine type: V-shaped
- Transmission: mechanical
Performance figures
- Maximum speed: 50 km/h (31 mph)
- Power output: 180 hp
Career
- Class: RUS - TU8G / (ТУ8Г); Belarus - TU8G / (ТУ8Г); Ukraine - TU8G / (ТУ8Г); Guinea - TU8GE / (ТУ8ГЭ)

The TU8G (ТУ8Г) is a Soviet, later Russian diesel locomotive for track gauge 750 mm (2 ft 5 1/2 in).

== History ==
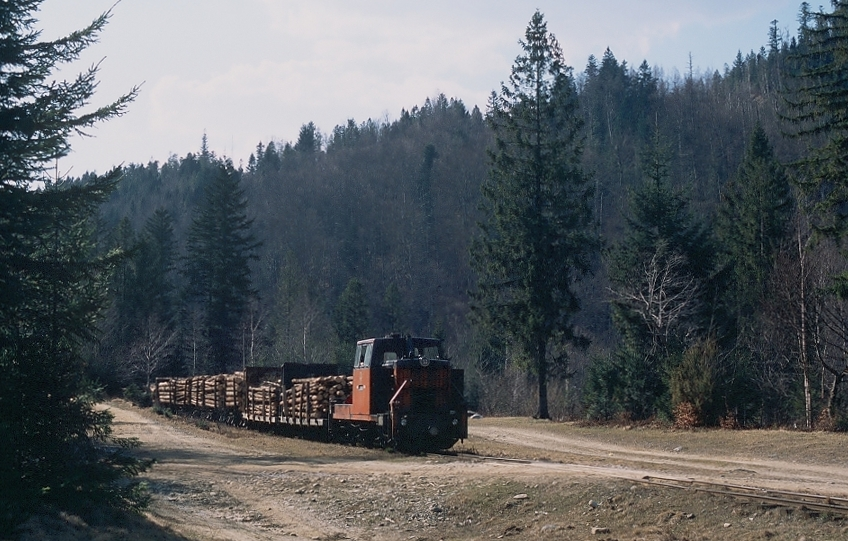
TU8G-0017, Ukraine

The diesel locomotive TU8G (ТУ8Г) is designed for loading and unloading and also general purpose locomotive for Narrow gauge railways. The TU8G was developed in 1987 - 1988 at the Kambarka Engineering Works to replace the aging locomotive classes TU6D (ТУ6Д). The TU8G was designed to be used on any gauge from 750 mm (2 ft 5 1/2 in) – 1,067 mm (3 ft 6 in). The cab is equipped with heat-system, refrigerator, radio-set and air conditioning. TU8G № 0022 - 0027 made on the 1,067 mm (3 ft 6 in) for the Sakhalin Railway.

== Additional specifications ==
- Carrying capacity of motor-car platform - 29.4 kN (6,600 lb_{f}) (3.0 t or 3.0 long tons or 3.3 short tons)
- Crane - hydraulic with moving remote control
- Carrying capacity - 9.8 kN (2,200 lb_{f}) (1.0 t or 0.98 long tons or 1.1 short tons)
- Angle of rotation (of crane) - 360°
- Max. boom-out (of crane) - 6.0 m (19.69 ft)
- Number of seats in the cabin - 6
- Distance between bogies - 4,000 mm (157.48 in)
- Base of bogies - 1,400 mm (55.12 in)

== See also ==
- Kambarka Engineering Works
- Narrow gauge railways
