= Lundanskaya narrow gauge railway =

Railway line in Russia

Coordinates: 60.471160°N 47.498148°E

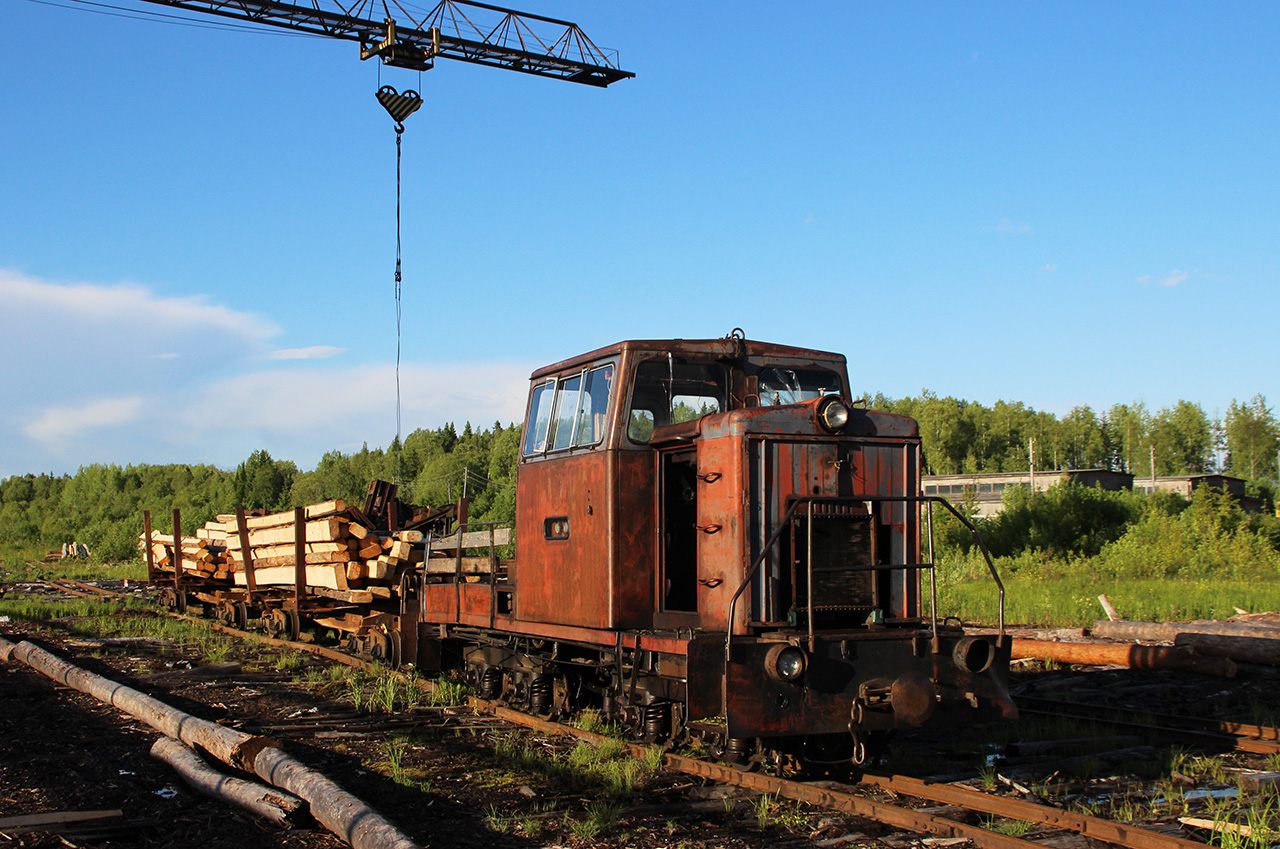

Overview
- Locale: Kirov Oblast, Russia
- Termini: Lundanka

Service
- Type: Narrow-gauge railway
- Operator: LLC «Ars-Group»

History
- Opened: 1950

Technical
- Line length: 15 kilometres (9.3 mi)
- Track gauge: 750 mm (2 ft 5 1/2 in)
Route map
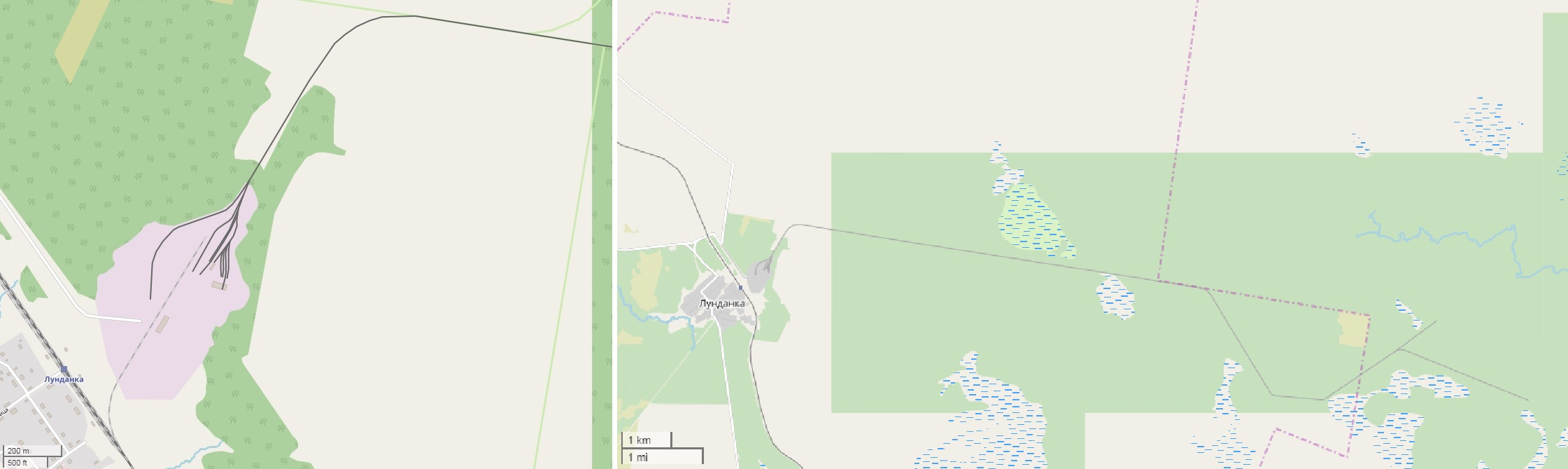

The 'Lundanskaya narrow gauge railway (Russian: Лунданская узкоколейная железная дорога, Lundanskaya uzkokoleynaya zheleznaya doroga) is a narrow-gauge railway in Kirov Oblast, Russia, built as an industrial railway (forest railway) for logging operations. The forest railway was opened in 1950, has a total length of 15 kilometres (9.3 mi) and is operational as of 2017, the track gauge is 750 mm (2 ft 5 1/2 in) and operates year-round.

== Current status ==
Planning for the railway began in 1948 and building began in 1948–1950. In 1950 regular wood transport on the railway started, between Lundanka and loggings. The Lundanskaya forestry railway's first line was constructed in 1950, in the area of Podosinovsky District in Kirov Oblast from the village Lundanka. The total length of the narrow gauge railway at the peak of its development exceeded 22 kilometres (14 mi), of which 15 kilometres (9.3 mi) are currently operational. The railway operates scheduled freight services from Lundanka, used for forestry tasks such as the transportation of felled logs and forestry workers. In 2017, repairs were made to the track.

== Rolling stock ==
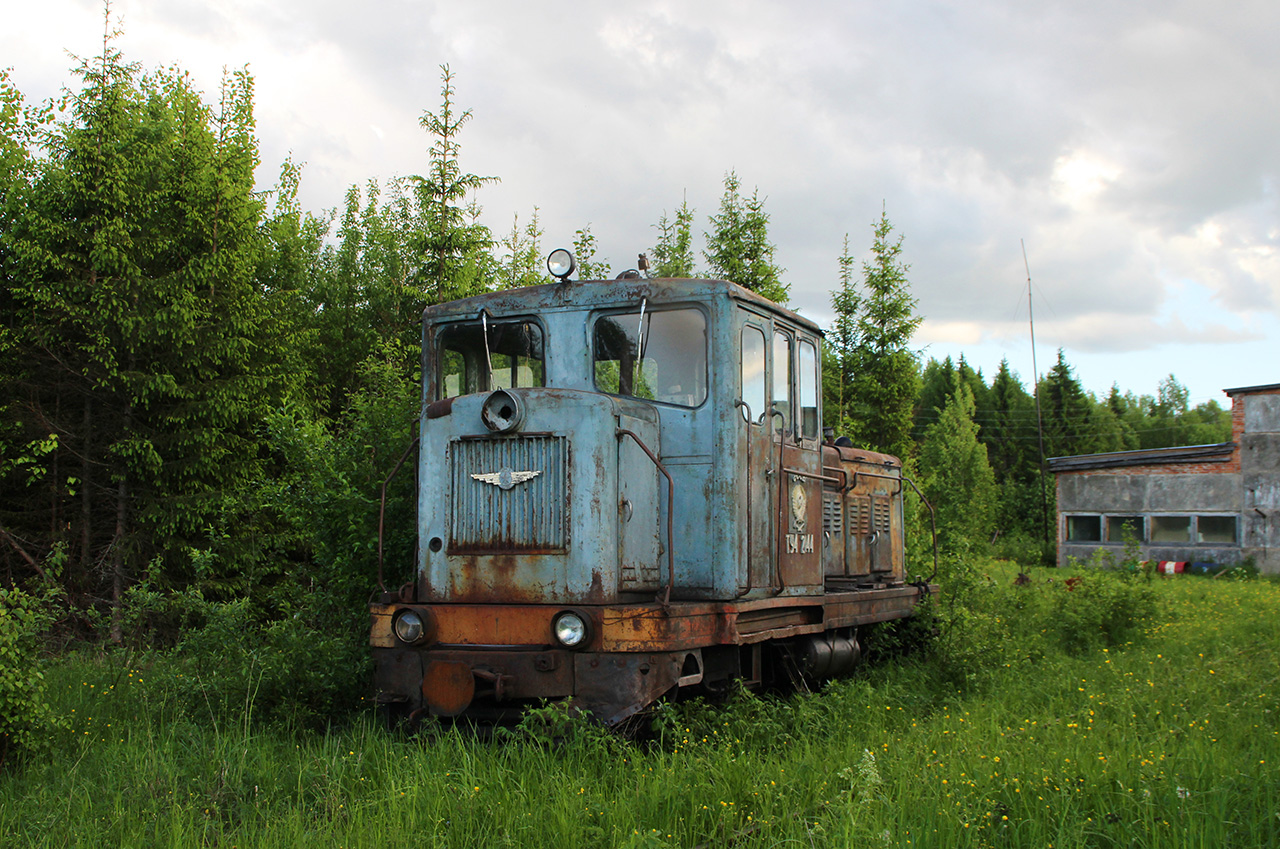
Locomotive TU4–2144

=== Locomotives ===
- TU4 – № 1829, 2144, 2440
- TU6D – № 0385
- Draisine – TD-5u "Pioneer" transportation local residents

=== Railroad car ===
- Tank car
- Passenger car
- Bunk Car "Teplushka"
- Railway log-car and flatcar
- Hopper car to transport track ballast

=== Work trains ===
- Snowplow

== See also ==
- Narrow-gauge railways in Russia
- List of Russian narrow-gauge railways rolling stock
- Kobrinskaya narrow-gauge railway
- Oparinskaya narrow-gauge railway
