= Ronga narrow gauge railway =

Coordinates: 56.70031°N 48.54645°E

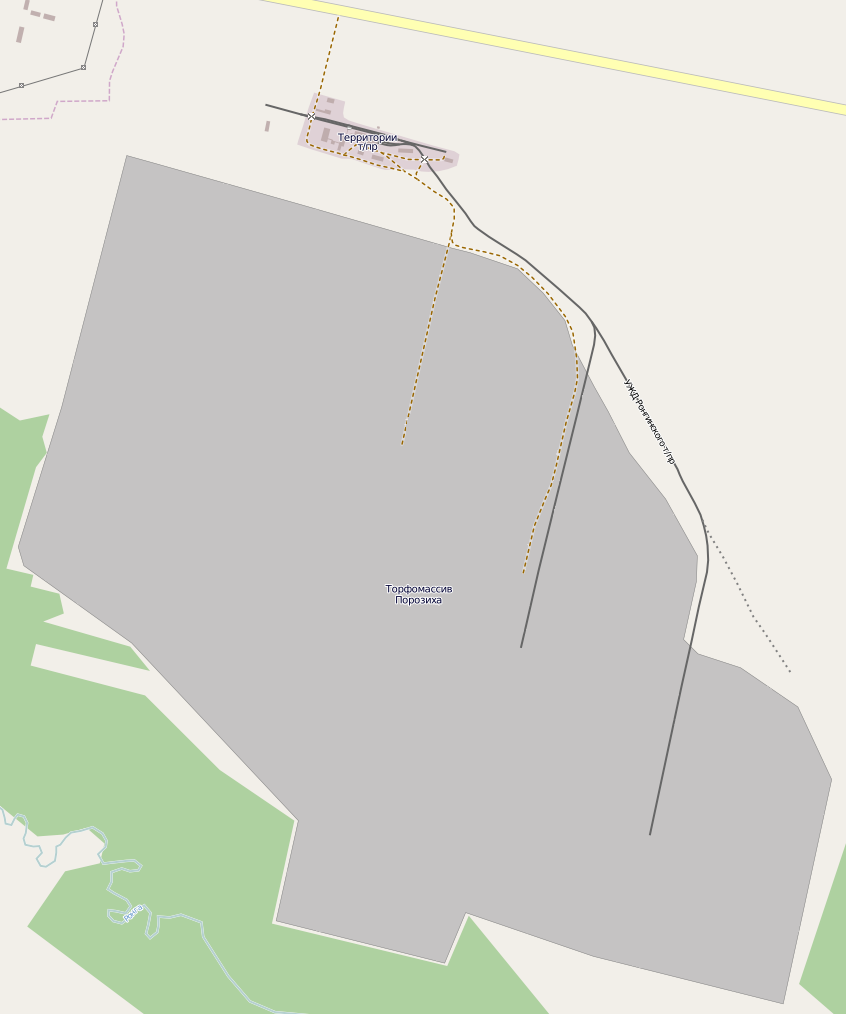

Overview
- Locale: Mari El, Russia
- Termini: Ronga
- Website: www.torfobriket.biz^{[usurped]}

Service
- Type: Narrow-gauge railway
- Operator(s): Ronga peat briquetting factory

History
- Opened: 1967

Technical
- Line length: 7 kilometres (4.3 mi)
- Track gauge: 750 mm (2 ft 5 1/2 in)
Route map
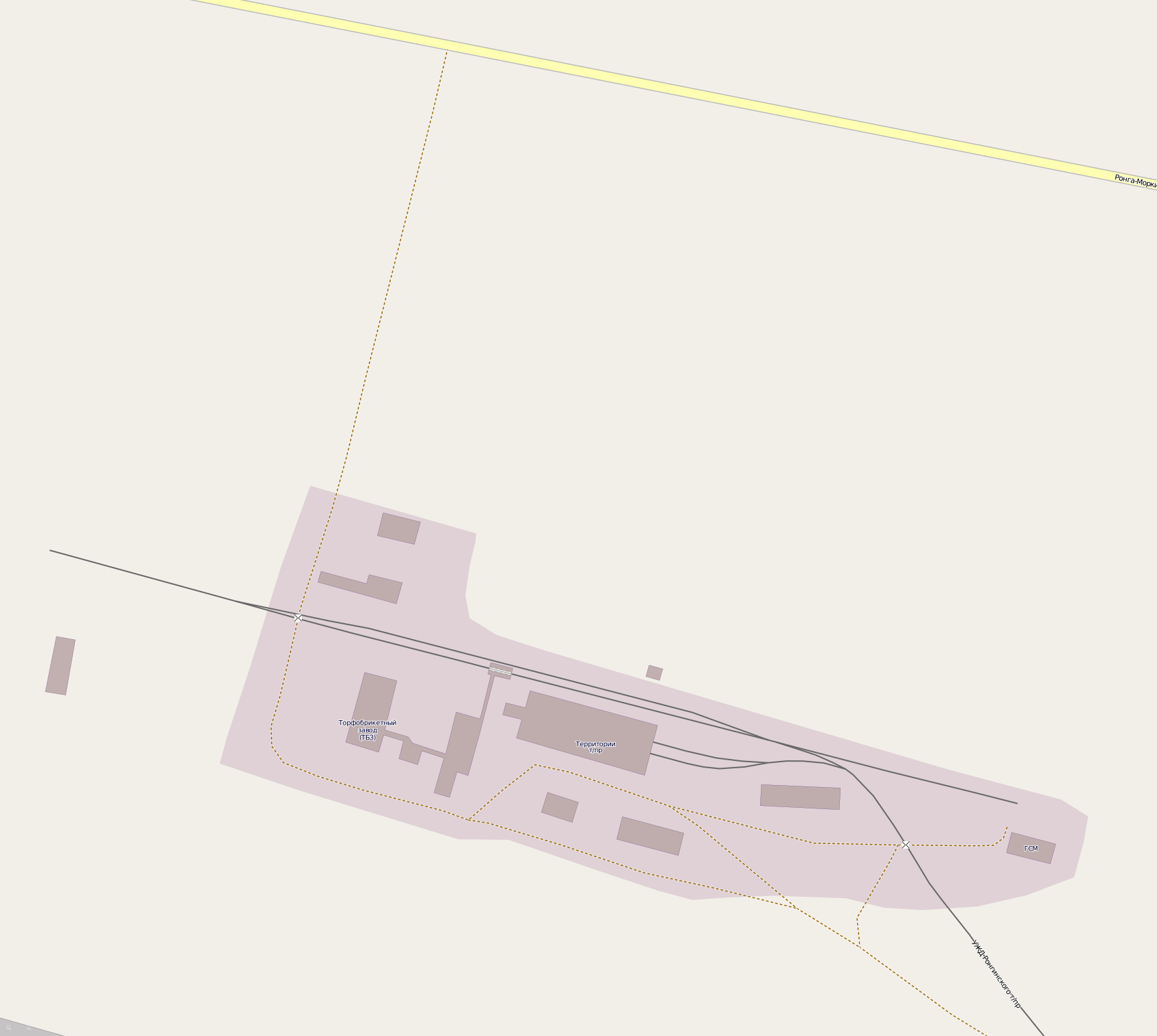

The Ronga narrow gauge railway (Russian: Узкоколейная железная дорога Ронгинского торфопредприятия, Ronga uzkokoleynaya zheleznaya doroga) is located in Mari El, Russia. The peat railway was opened in 1967 and has a total length of 7 kilometres (4.3 mi). It remains operational as of 2017. The track gauge is 750 mm (2 ft 5 1/2 in) and it operates year-round.

== Current status ==
The peat enterprise Ronga was established in the 1960s in the village of Ronga, Mari El. The first line of the Ronga peat narrow-gauge railway was constructed in 1967 within the Sovetsky District, starting from the village of Ronga. The peat railway was specifically built for hauling milling peat and transporting workers, and it operates year-round. At its peak of development, the total length of the narrow-gauge railway exceeded 10 kilometres (6.2 mi), of which 7 kilometres (4.3 mi) is currently operational. In 2011, repairs were being made to the track.

== Rolling stock ==
=== Locomotives ===
- TU6A – № 3745
- TU8

=== Railway cars ===
- Flatcar
- Open wagon for peat TSV6A

=== Work trains ===
- TU6A with a snowplow LD-24
- Draisine – TD-5u "Pioneer"

== See also ==
- Narrow-gauge railways in Russia
- List of Russian narrow-gauge railways rolling stock
