= Belorucheyskaya narrow-gauge railway =

Coordinates: 60.912443°N 36.854818°E

Belorucheiskaya narrow-gauge railway
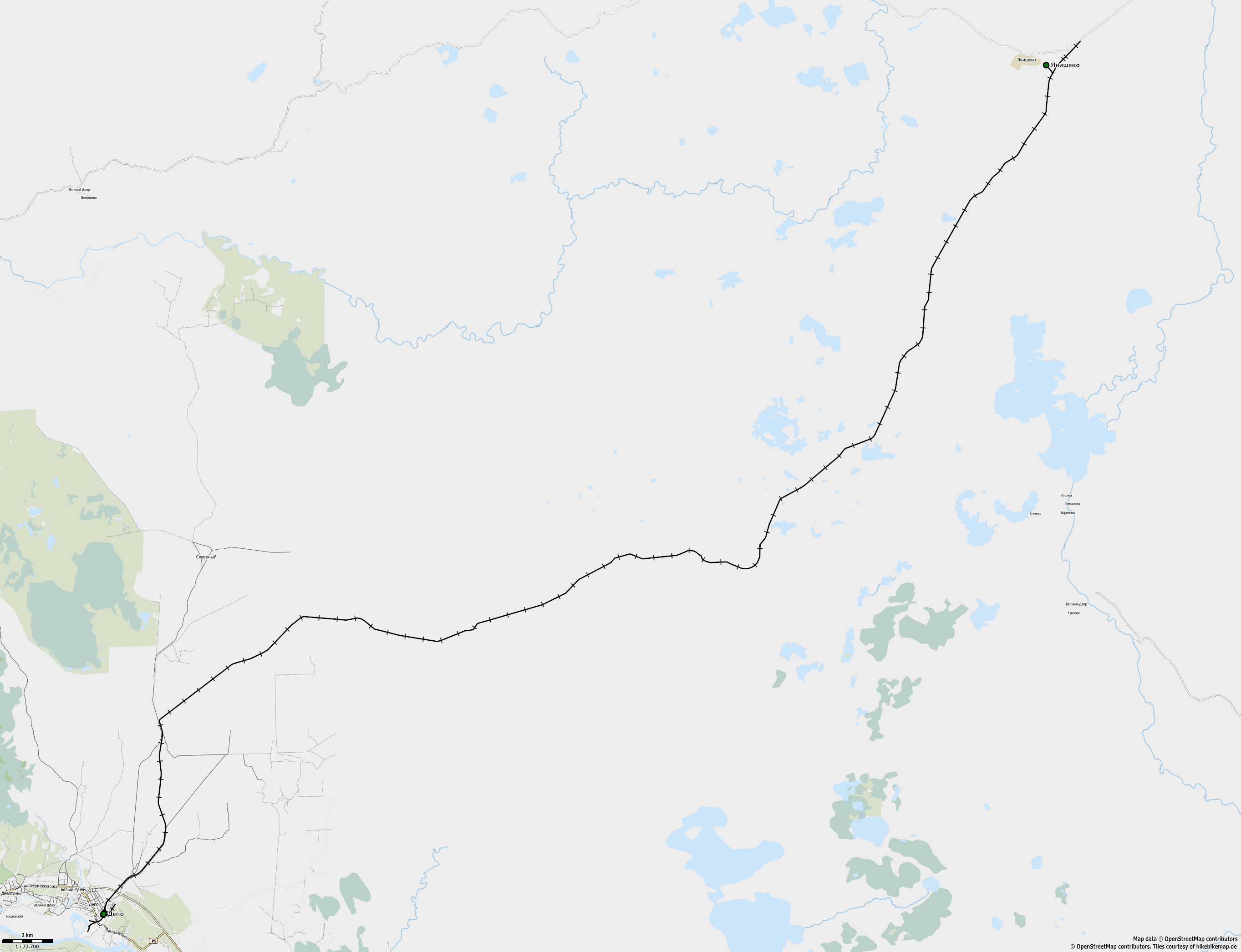

Overview
- Locale: Vologda Oblast, Russia
- Termini: Depo
- Website: белый-ручей.рф

Service
- Type: Narrow-gauge railway
- Operator: ZAO Bely Ruchey

History
- Opened: 1922

Technical
- Line length: 63 kilometres (39 mi)
- Track gauge: 750 mm (2 ft 5 1/2 in)

The Belorucheiskaya narrow-gauge railway is located in Vologda Oblast, Russia. The forest railway was opened in 1922, has a total length of 63 kilometres (39 mi) and is operational as of 2015. The track gauge is 750 mm (2 ft 5 1/2 in) and operates year-round.

== Current status ==
The Belorucheiskaya narrow-gauge railway's first line was constructed in 1922, in the area of Vytegorsky District, Vologda Oblast from the village Depo. The total length of the Belorucheiskaya narrow-gauge railway at the peak of its development exceeded 110 kilometres (68 mi), of which 63 kilometres (39 mi) is currently operational. The narrow-gauge railway operates a scheduled freight services from Depo is used for forestry tasks such as the transportation of felled logs and forestry workers. In 2014, repairs are being made to the track.

== Rolling stock ==
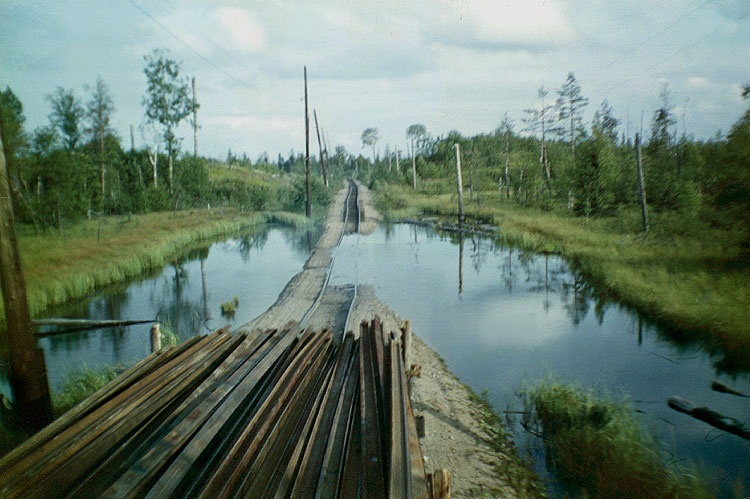
Belorucheiskaya forestry railway 1977

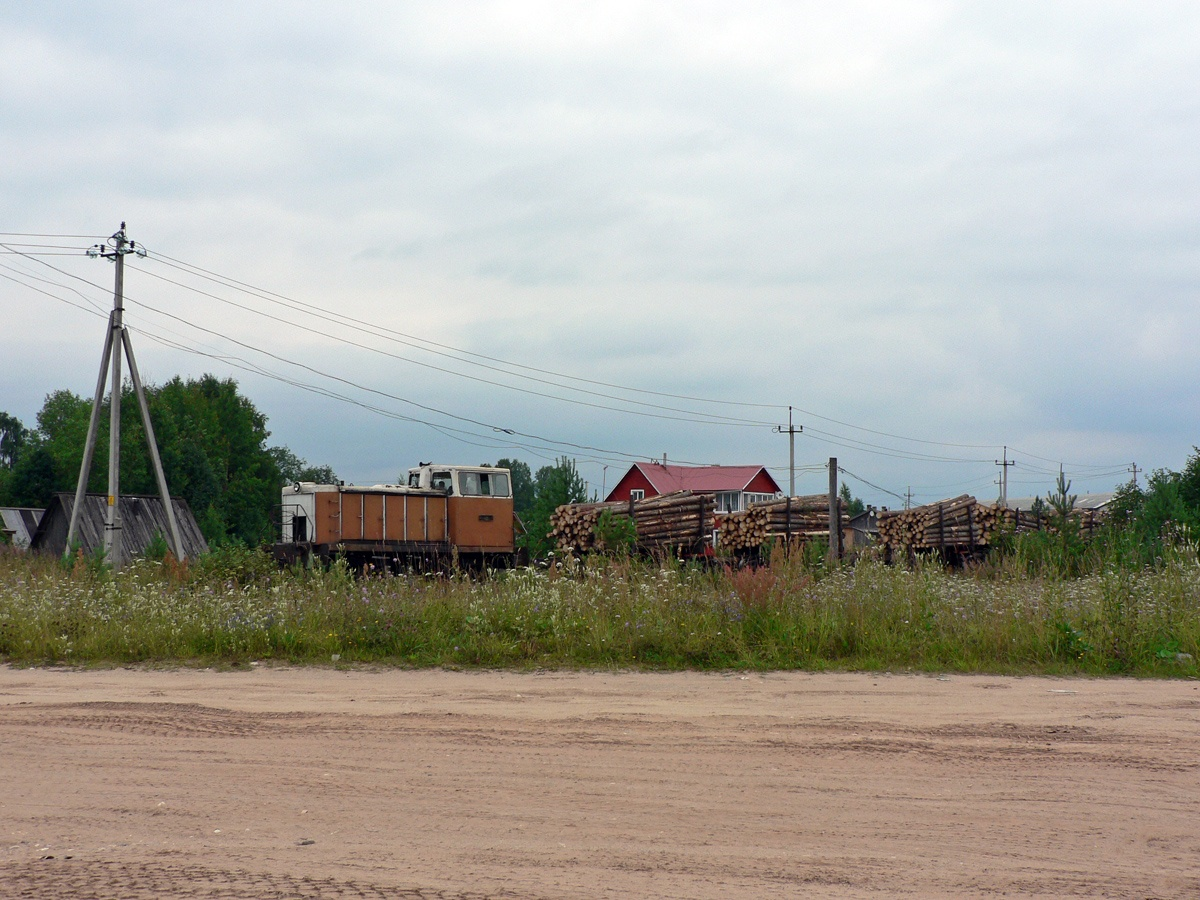
TU8 – № 0017

=== Locomotives ===
- TU7 – № 2240, 2355, 2406, 2463, 2880, 3334
- TU8 – № 0017, 0055, 0064
- TU6D – № 0289
- TD-5U "Pioneer"

=== Railroad cars ===
- Boxcar
- Tank car
- Snowplow
- Dining car
- Passenger car
- Railway log-car and flatcar
- Hopper car to transport track ballast

=== Work trains ===
- Crane LP-19
- Track UPS-1

== Gallery ==
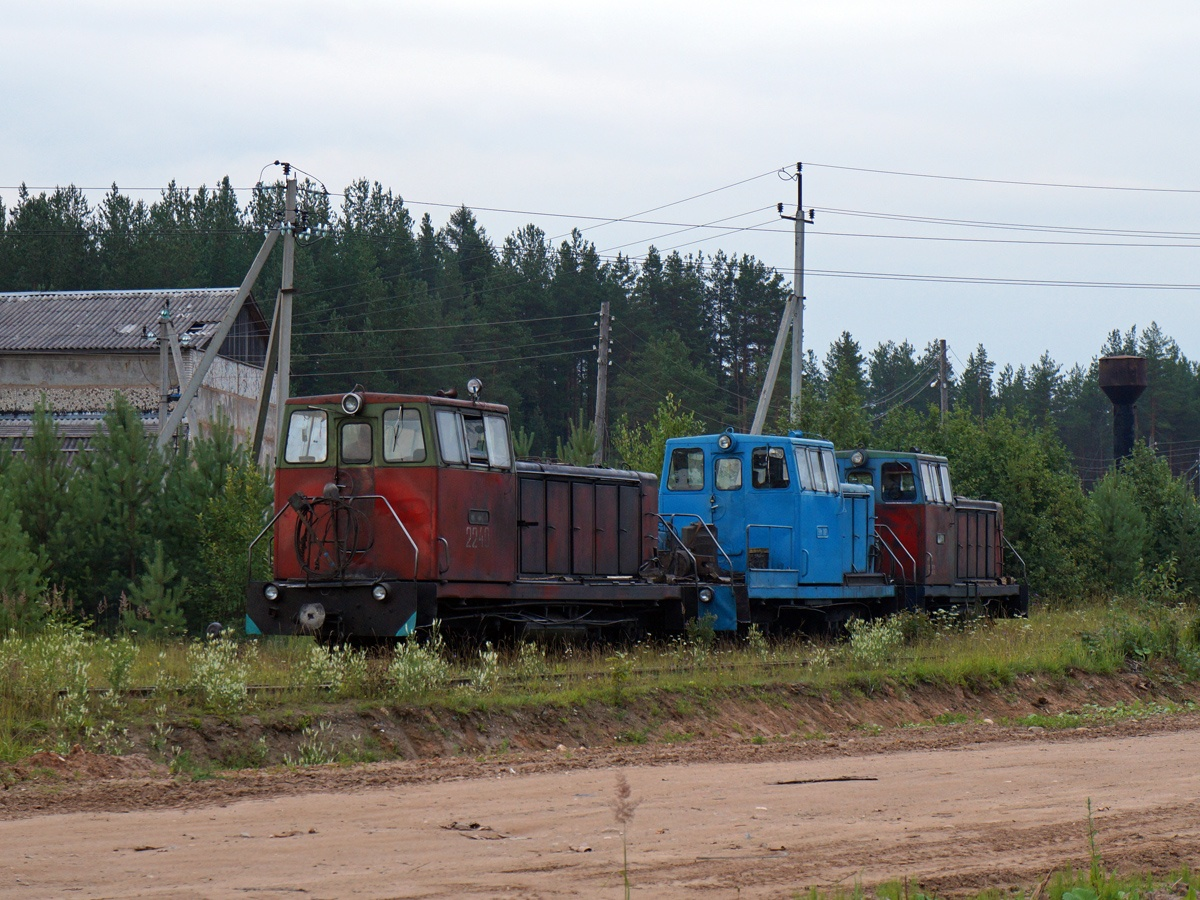
Locomotives

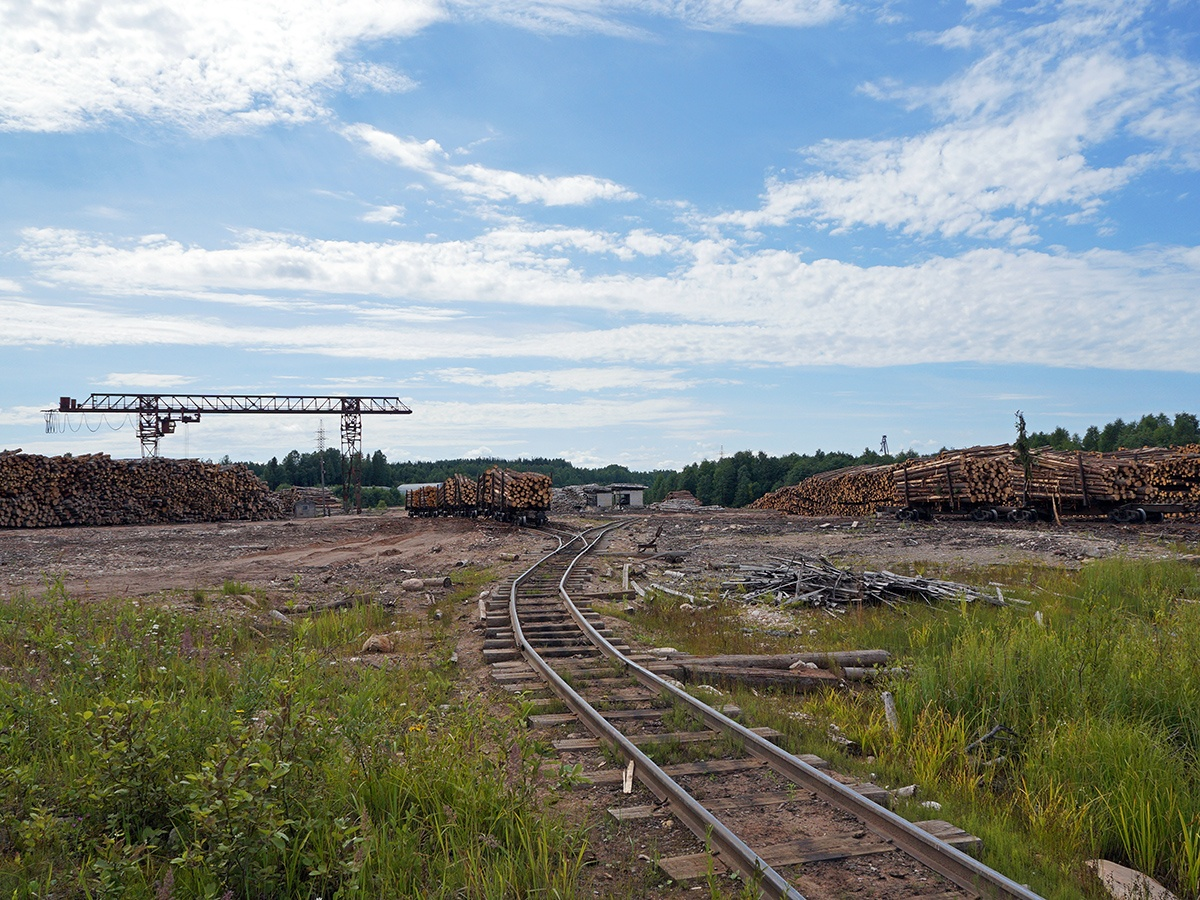
Log Transload

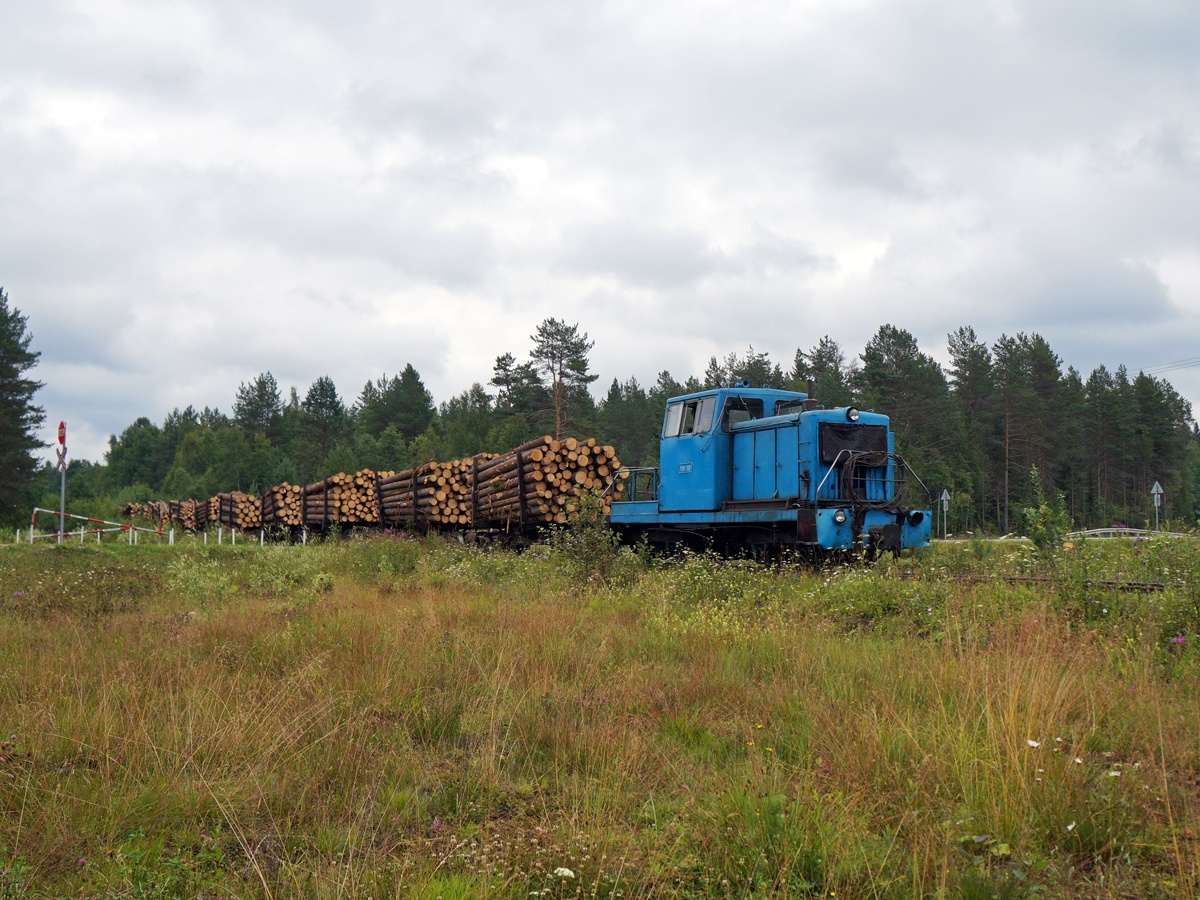
TU8 – № 0064

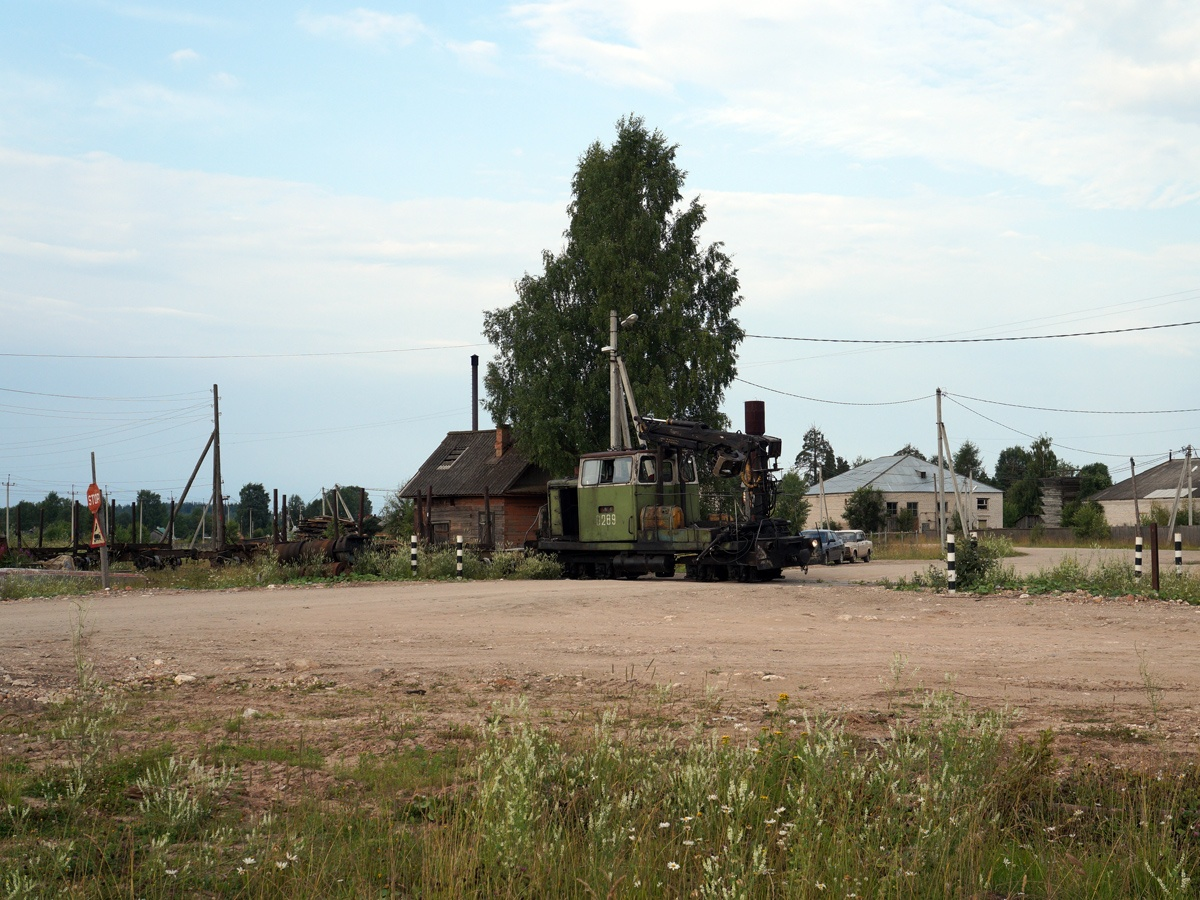
TU6D – № 0289

== See also ==
- Narrow-gauge railways in Russia
- List of Russian narrow-gauge railways rolling stock
