= Narrow-gauge railways in Russia =

The Imperial Russian narrow railway track gauge was 3 ft 6 in (1,067 mm), the current track gauge is predominantly 750 mm (2 ft 5 1/2 in). In Soviet Russia, narrow-gauge railways were mostly common in forestry and peat industries in low inhabited places. Usually they have one main line and number of temporary branches. There was commonly a passenger service to villages and towns for workers.

As of the mid 2010s, a number of industrial railways survive in places with bad roads, but every year some railways are closing. A government railway operator, RZD, closed all owned common 750 mm railways, but still have a number of children's railways with standard rolling stock.

The most well-known narrow-gauge railways are Alapayevsk narrow-gauge railway (municipal passenger), Apsheronsk narrow-gauge railway (mountain industrial railway with passenger service), and Karinskaya narrow-gauge railway (suburban passenger private railway). Also children's railways are located in many big cities.

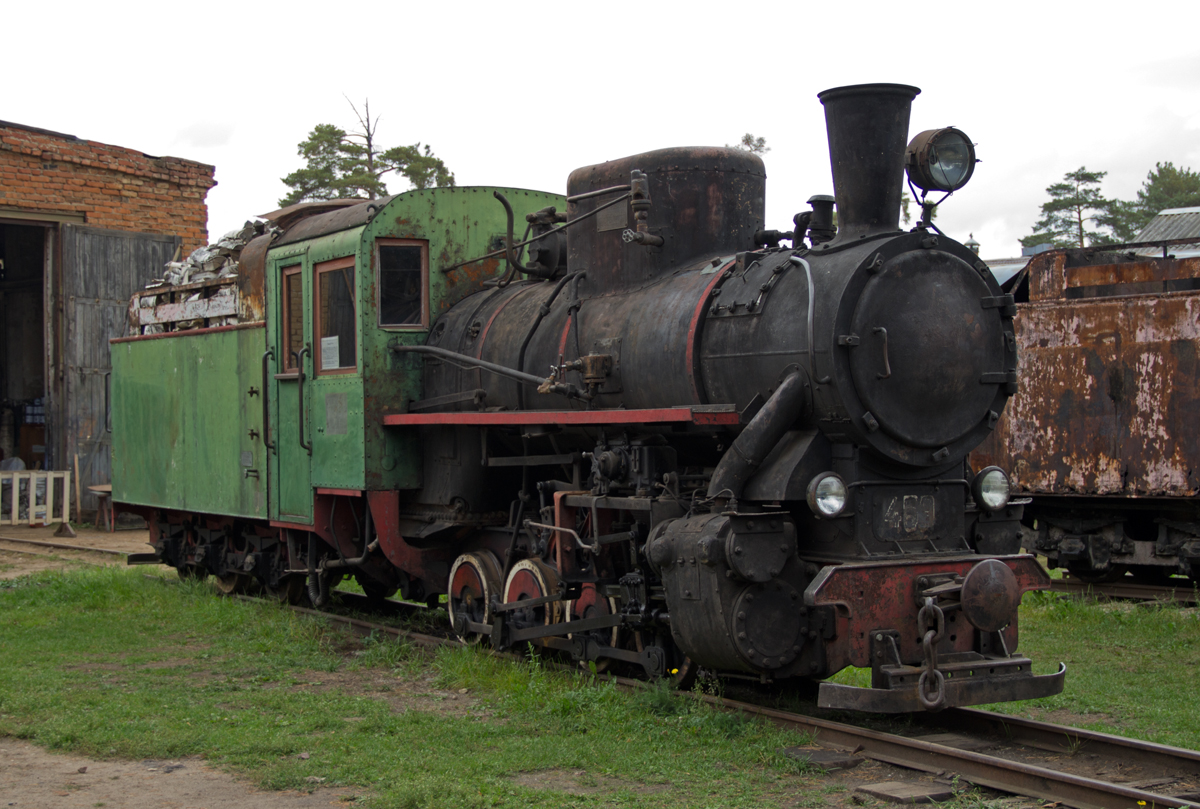
Kp4-469, Pereslavl Railway

== Overview ==
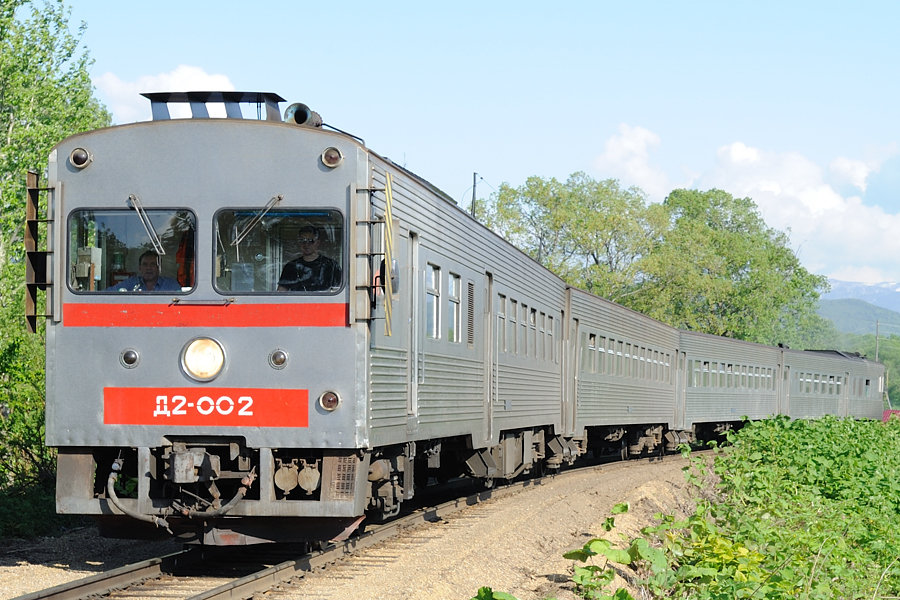
D2-002, Sakhalin Railway

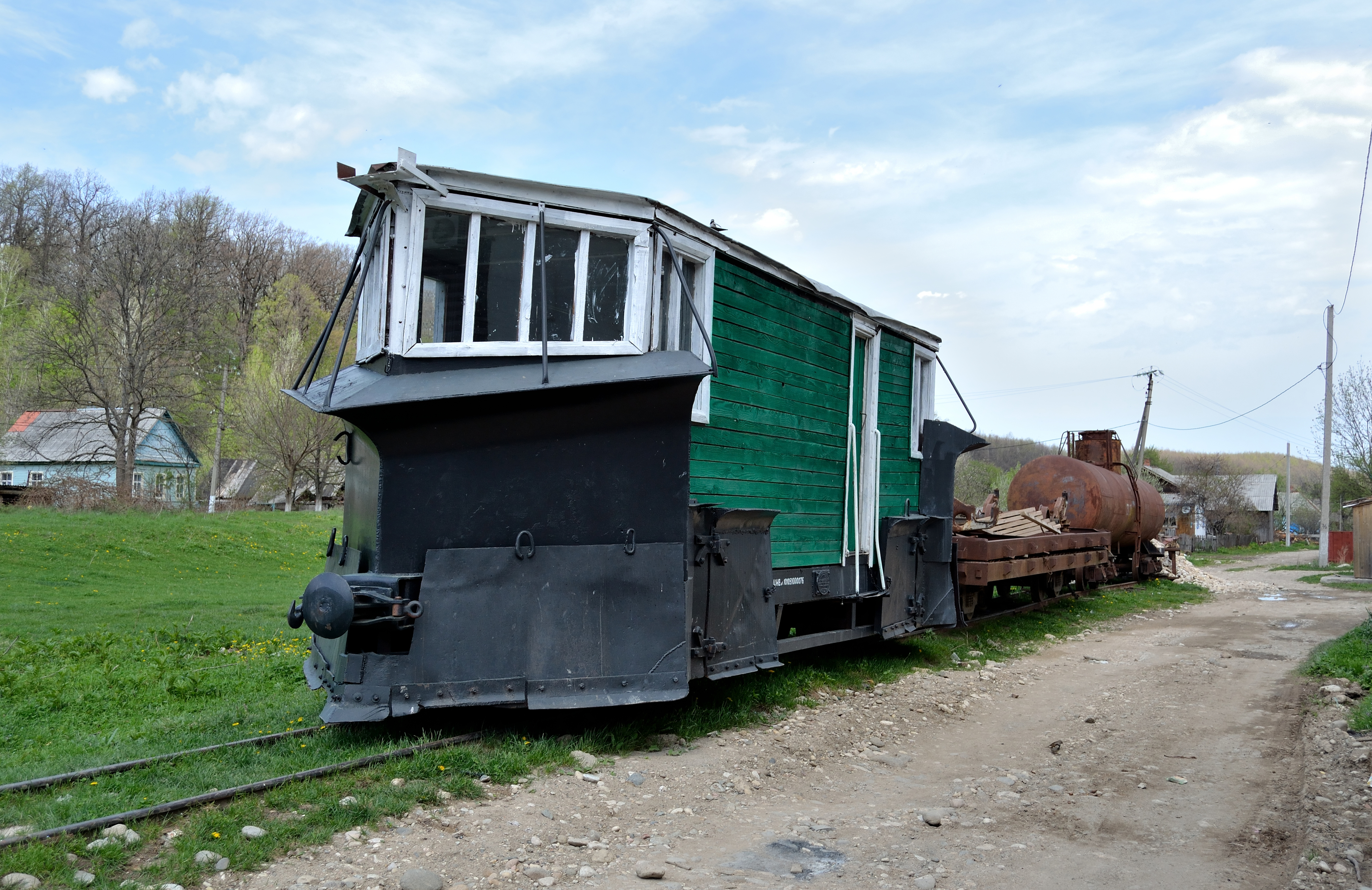
Snowplow, Apsheronsk railway

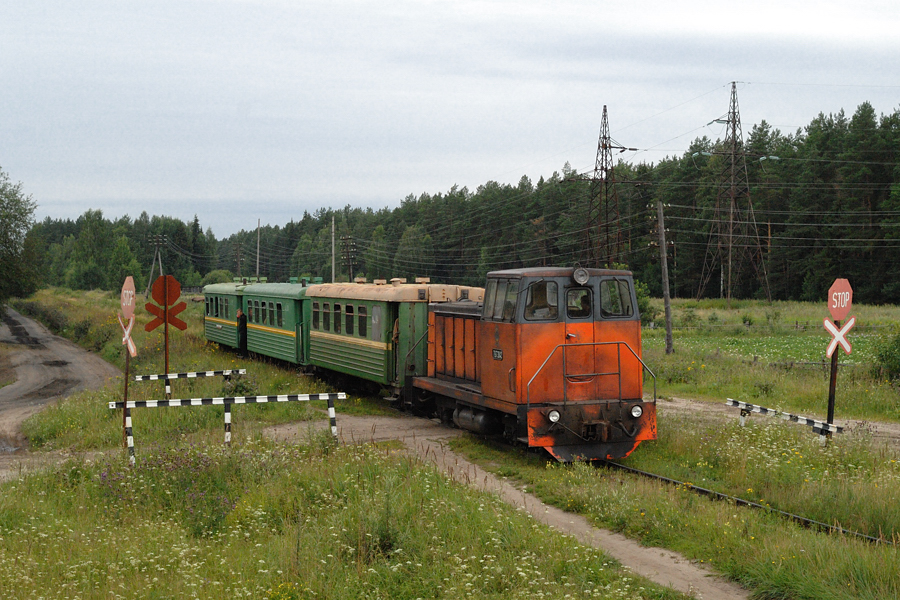
TU7A–3042, Kirov Oblast

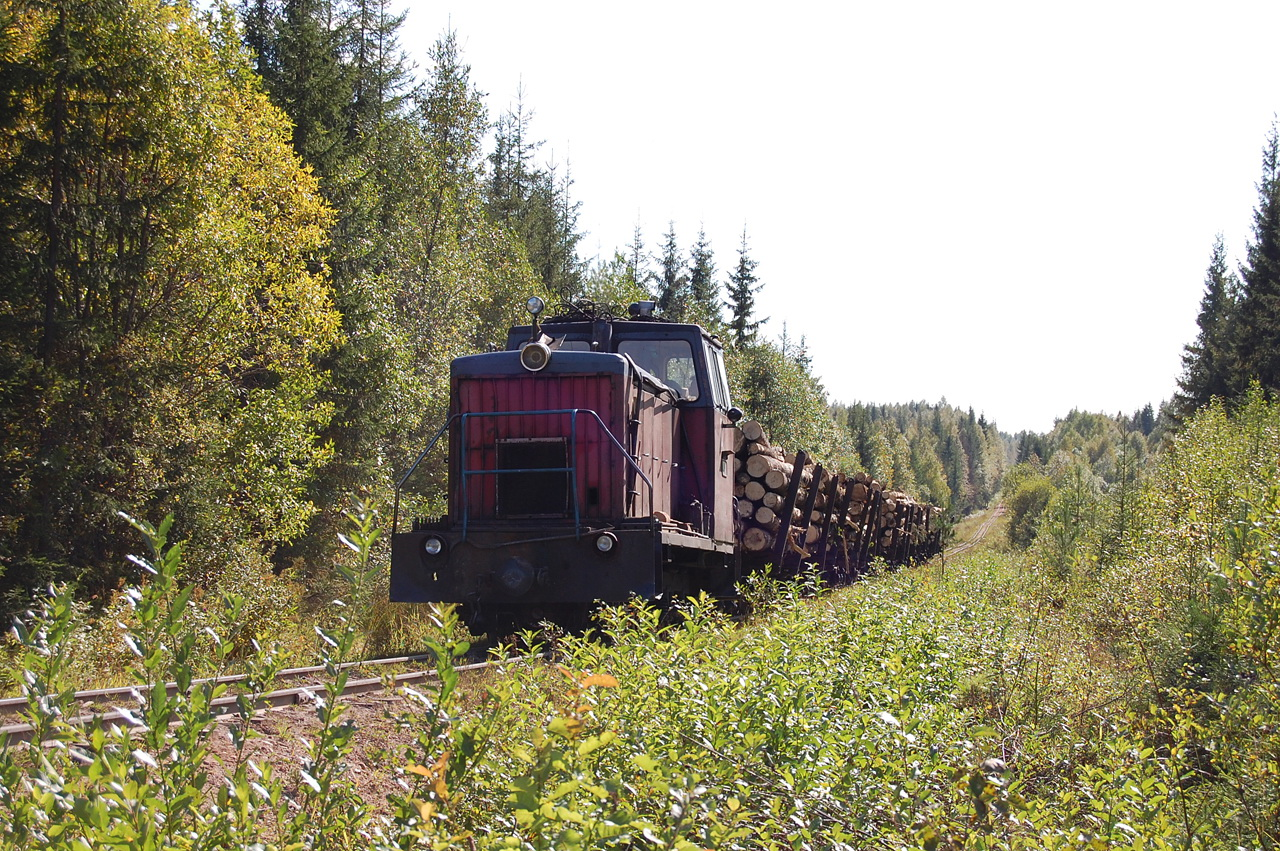
Log train, Udimskaya railway

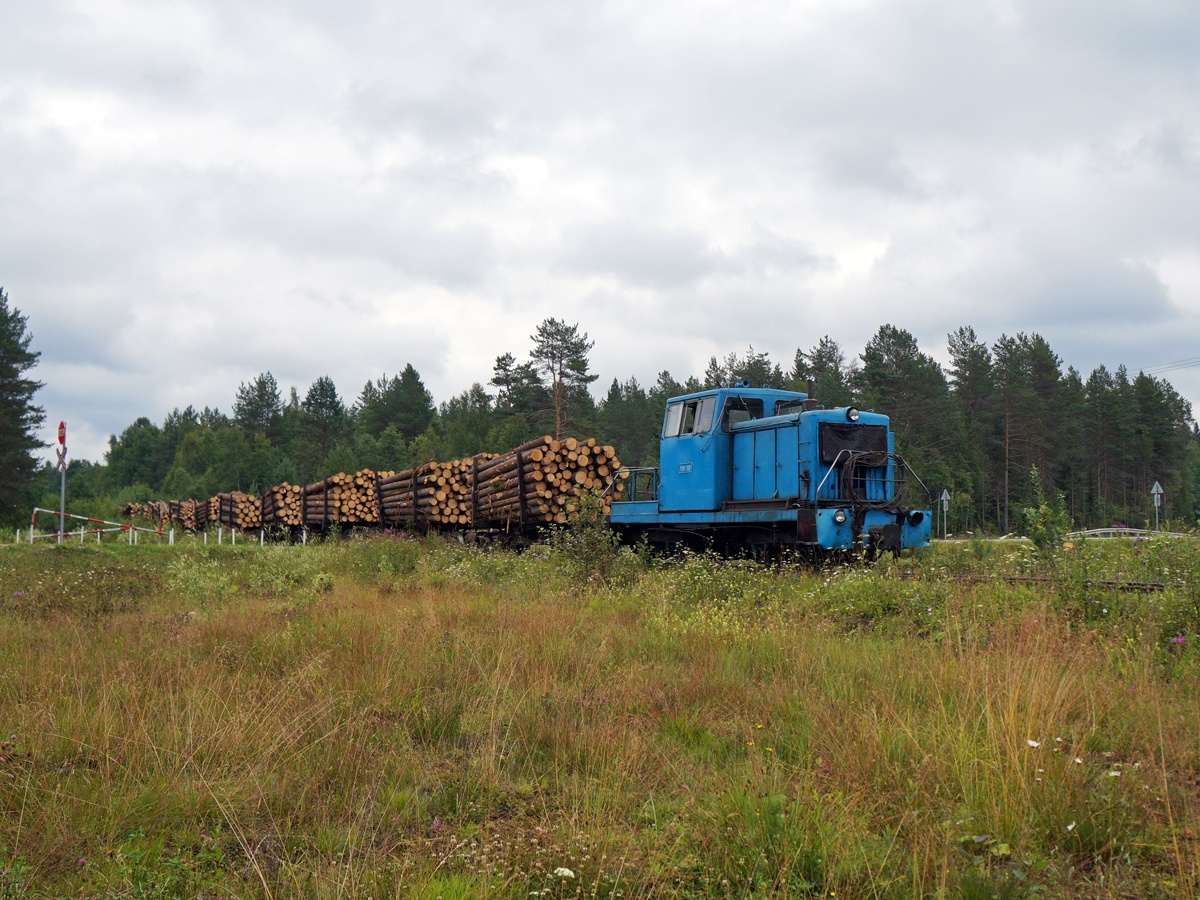
Log train, Belorucheiskaya railway

=== 1067mm ===
- Sakhalin Railway. This railway was built by Japan who occupied southern Sakhalin after the Russo-Japanese War. The network was extended to the northern part of the island in the Soviet era. It was the last Russian railway in 3 ft 6 in (1,067 mm) and underwent conversion to 1,520 mm (4 ft 11 27/32 in) from 2003 to 2019.
- Kulebaki Factory Railway is located in Kulebaki.

=== 750mm ===
- Alapayevsk narrow-gauge railway is located in the Sverdlovsk Oblast, Alapayevsk.
- Altsevo peat railway is located in Nizhny Novgorod Oblast, closed in 2015.
- Apsheronsk narrow-gauge railway the largest mountain railway in Russia.
- Belorucheiskaya narrow-gauge railway is located in Vologda Oblast.
- Dymnoye peat railway is located in Kirov Oblast.
- Gladkoye narrow-gauge railway is located in Leningrad Oblast.
- Gorokhovskoye peat railway is located in Kirov Oblast.
- Gusevskoye peat railway is located in Vladimir Oblast.
- Kerzhenets peat railway is located in Nizhny Novgorod Oblast, closed in 2014.
- Kobrinskaya narrow-gauge railway is located in Kirov Oblast.
- Konetsgorskaya narrow-gauge railway is located in Arkhangelsk Oblast, closed in 2018.
- Kudemskaya narrow-gauge railway has appeared in Forbes.ru ranking one of the 10 most beautiful railway lines of the world in the year 2010.
- Kushaverskoye peat railway is located in Novgorod Oblast.
- Laryan narrow-gauge railway is located in Leningrad Oblast.
- Loyginskaya narrow-gauge railway is located in Arkhangelsk Oblast.
- Lundanskaya narrow gauge railway is located in Kirov Oblast.
- Mesherskoye peat railway is located in Ryazan Oblast.
- Mokeiha-Zybinskoe peat railway is located in Yaroslavl Oblast, closed in 2016.
- Narrow-gauge railway of Decor-1 factory, is located in the Nizhny Novgorod Oblast.
- Narrow-gauge railway of Caprolactam factory, is located in the Dzerzhinsk, closed in 2013.
- Narrow-gauge railway of KSM-2 factory, is located in the Tver, closed in 2020.
- Nyubskaya narrow-gauge railway is located in Arkhangelsk Oblast.
- Pereslavl Railway Museum is located in Yaroslavl Oblast.
- Pelgorskoye peat railway is located in Leningrad Oblast.
- Pishchalskoye peat railway is located in Kirov Oblast.
- Pizhemskaya narrow gauge railway, is located in the Nizhny Novgorod Oblast.
- Ronga narrow gauge railway, is located in the Mari El, closed in 2020.
- Oparinskaya narrow-gauge railway is located in Kirov Oblast, closed in 2020.
- Otvorskoye peat railway is located in Kirov Oblast, closed in 2020.
- Sharya Forest Museum Railway is located in Kostroma Oblast.
- Solotchinskoye peat railway is located in Ryazan Oblast.
- Tumskaja–Golowanowa Datscha railway line, closed in 2008, part of the Gorky Railway
- Tyosovo peat railway is located in Novgorod Oblast.
- Udimskaya narrow-gauge railway is located in Arkhangelsk Oblast.
- Zelennikovskaya narrow-gauge railway is located in Arkhangelsk Oblast, closed in 2018.

== See also ==
- Kambarka Engineering Works
- List of Russian narrow gauge railways rolling stock

== Resource ==
- This site contains material of Russian narrow-gauge railways. uzd.spb (in Russian)
- A complete list of Russian and other ex-Soviet. narrow.parovoz.com (in Russian)
- «The site of the railroad» S. Bolashenko. infojd.ru (in Russian)
- Pereslavl Railway Museum. www.kukushka.ru (in Russian)
