= Alapayevsk narrow-gauge railway =

Railway in Sverdlovsk Oblast, Russia

Coordinates: 57.84731°N 61.67245°E

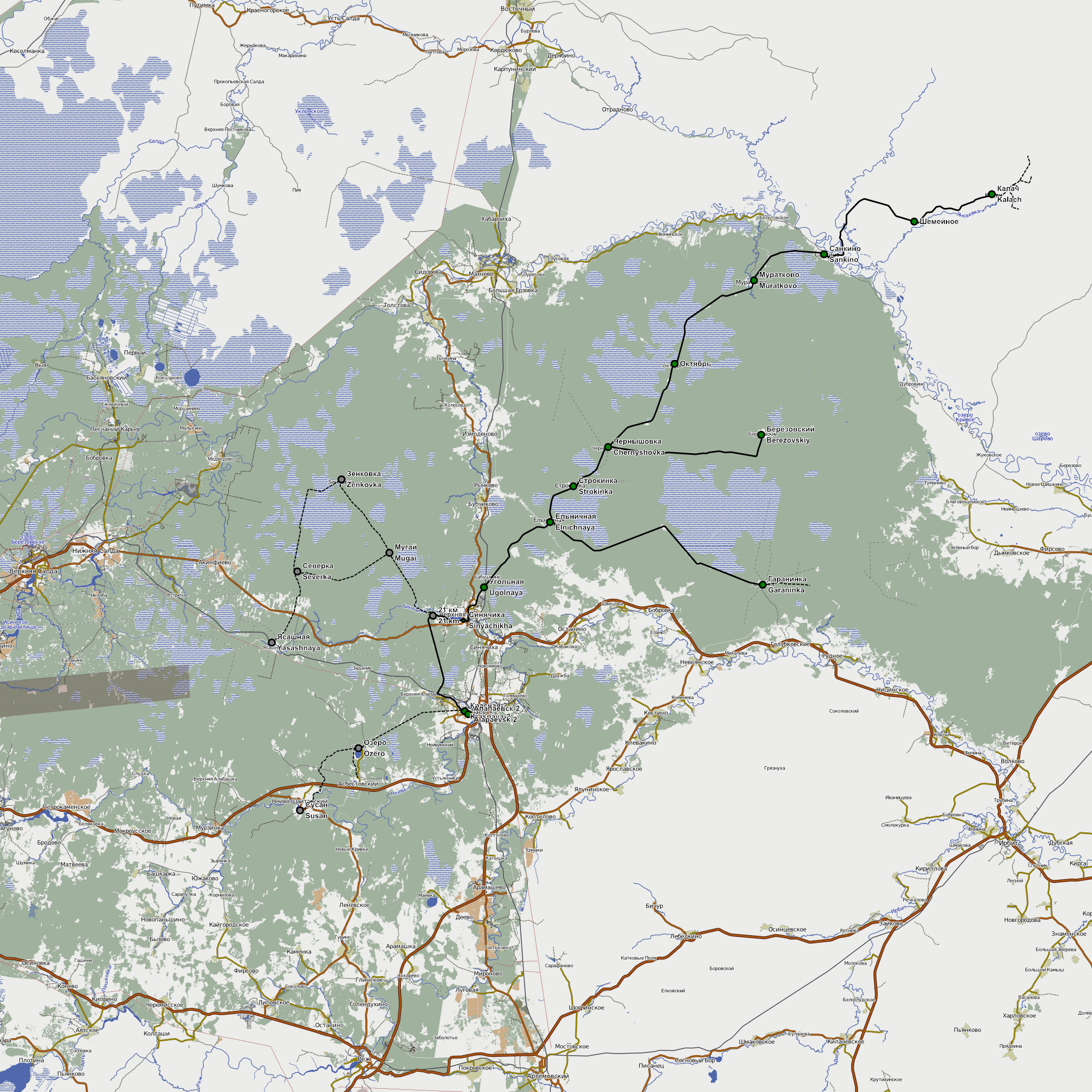

Overview
- Native name: Алапаевская узкоколейная железная дорога АУЖД
- Locale: Sverdlovsk Oblast, Russia
- Termini: Alapayevsk

Service
- Type: Narrow gauge railway
- Operator: МУП «АУЖД»

History
- Opened: 1898

Technical
- Line length: 250 kilometres (160 mi)
- Track gauge: 750 mm (2 ft 5 1/2 in)
Route map
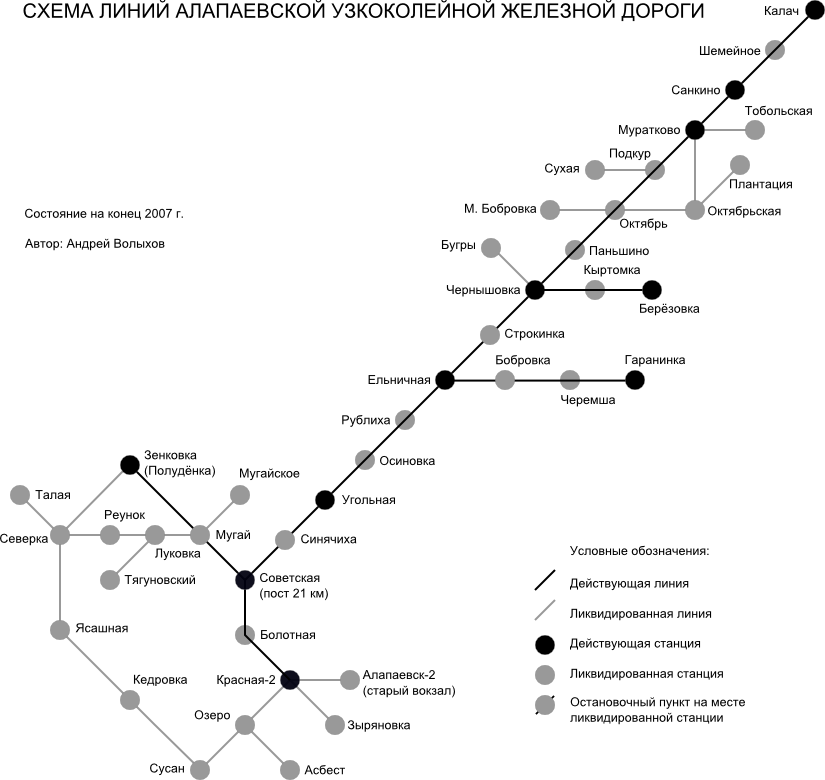

The Alapayevsk narrow-gauge railway (Russian: Алапаевская узкоколейная железная дорога, АУЖД) is a Russian narrow-gauge railway with a track gauge of 750 mm (2 ft 5 1/2 in). The Head Office of the narrow-gauge railway is located in Alapayevsk, Sverdlovsk Oblast.

== History ==
The first section of the railway (Alapayevsk–Mugay) commenced operations in July 1898. Construction was undertaken by French businessman A.Illero. The railway had a maximum length of about 600 kilometres (370 mi) in the 1970s, though estimates vary.

== Current status ==

At present only 177 kilometres (110 mi) of the railway is operational. Current operations include passenger traffic and general goods movement. The railway operates a scheduled passenger service from Alapayevsk. The railway is the primary means of communication for seven rural settlements in the Alapaevsk District: Elnichnaya; Strokinka; Berezovka; Muratkovo; Sankin and Kalach. Principal cargoes include wood, food, postal services and fuel.

== Rolling stock ==
=== Locomotives ===
- TU4 – № 1800, 1637, 1332, 1828, 1452, 2881, 1452
- TU7 – № 2386, 2388, 2083, 1915, 1659, 3367
- TU6A – № 2526, 2896
- TU8 – № 0010
- PD-1 railcar
- SMD railcar
- TD-5U "Pioneer" – Transportation local residents

=== Railroad car ===
- Boxcar
- Flatcar
- Tank car
- Snowplow
- Hopper car
- Open wagon
- Passenger car (rail)

== Gallery ==
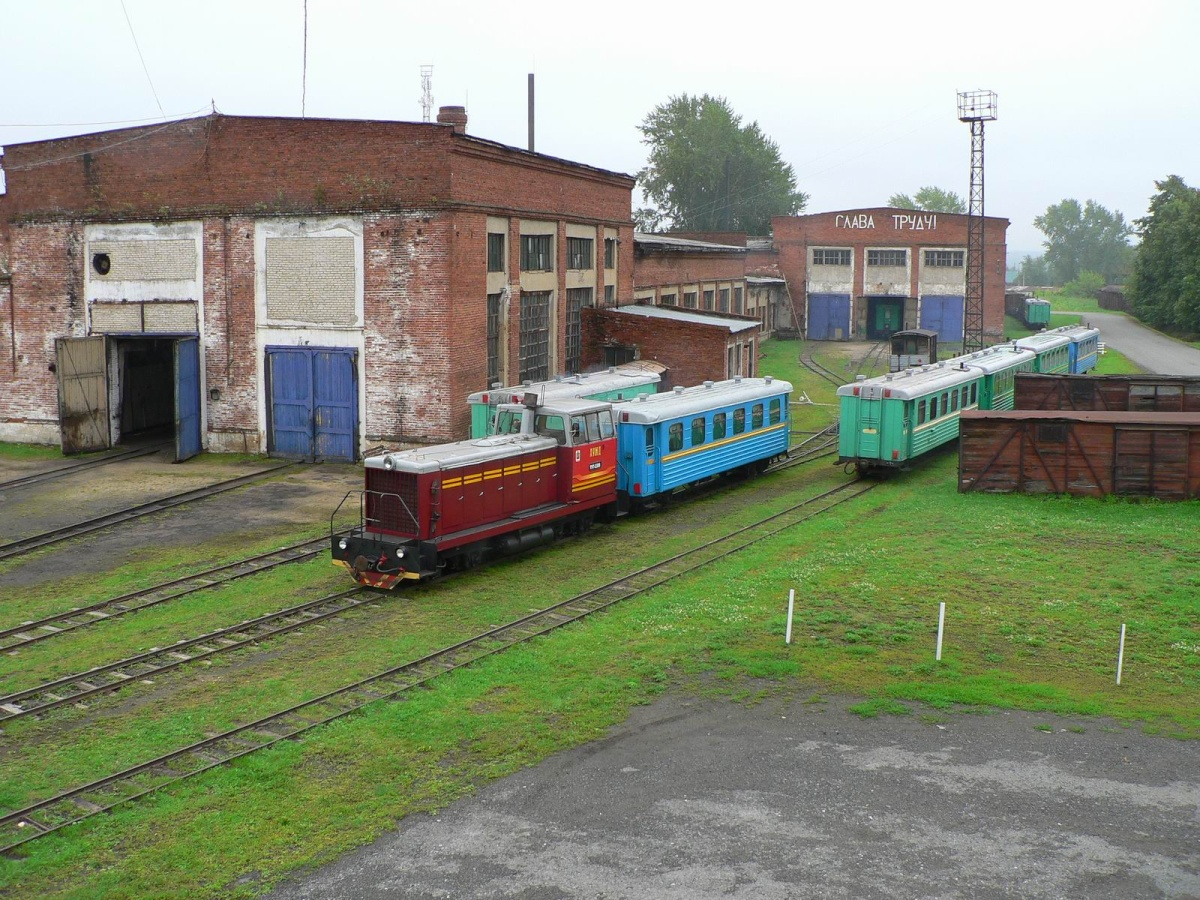
Alapaevsk railway depot

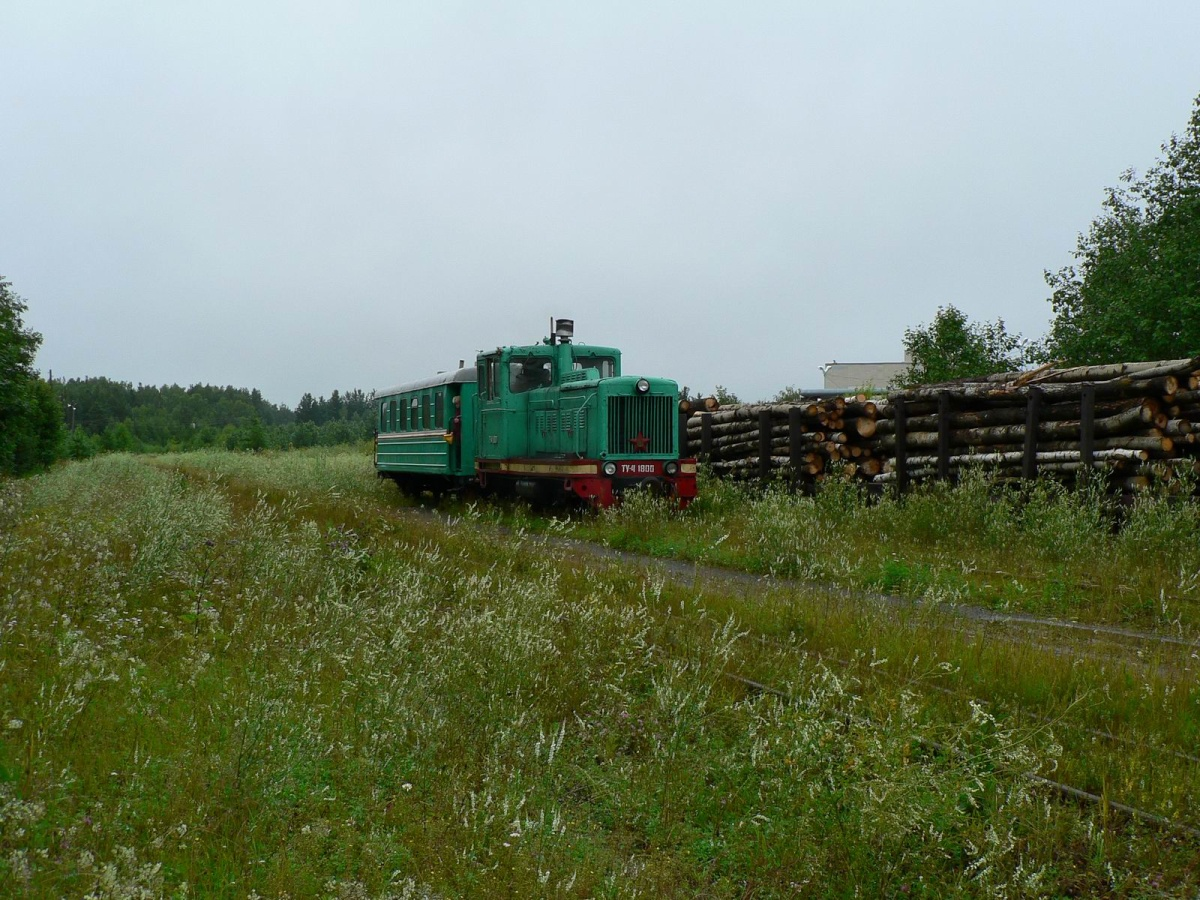
TU4-1800 with passenger train

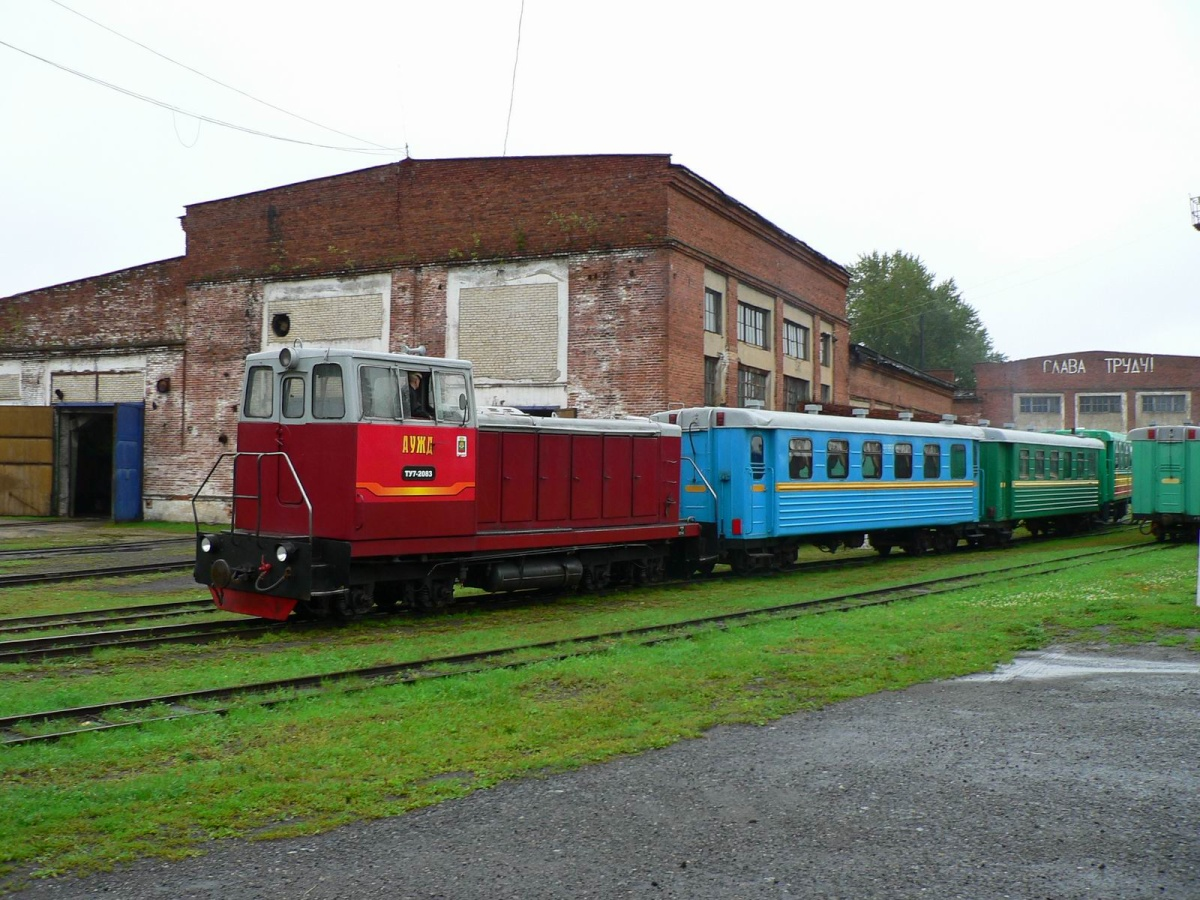
TU7–2083 with passenger train

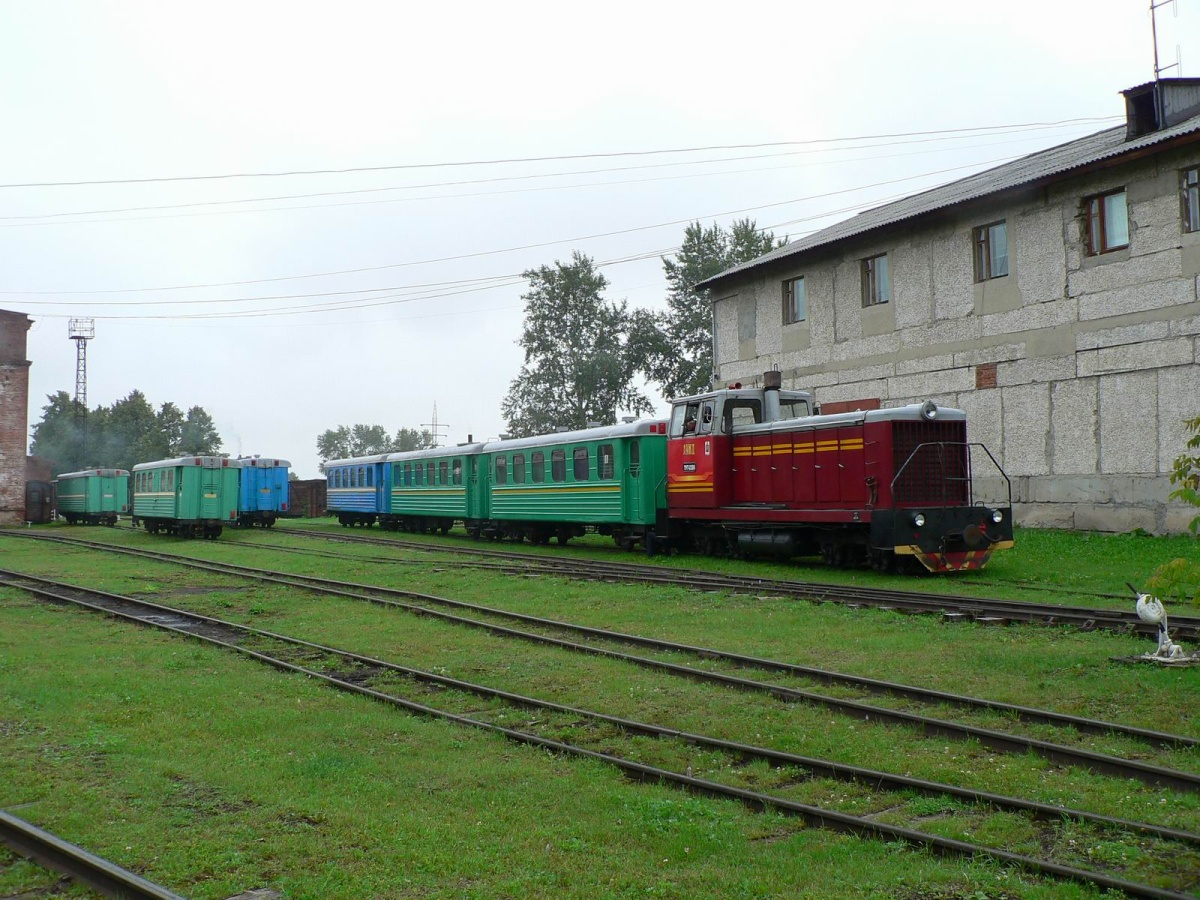
TU7–2386 with passenger train

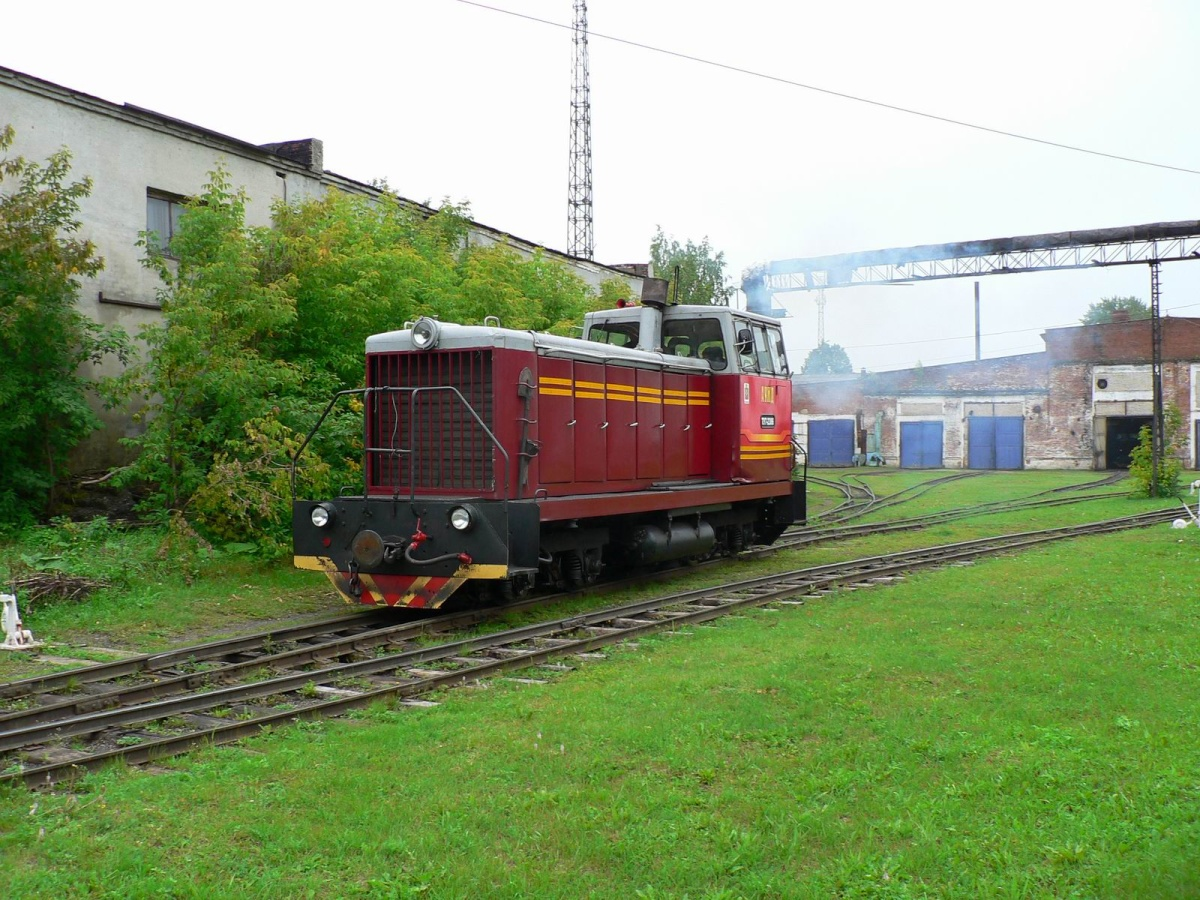
TU7–2386

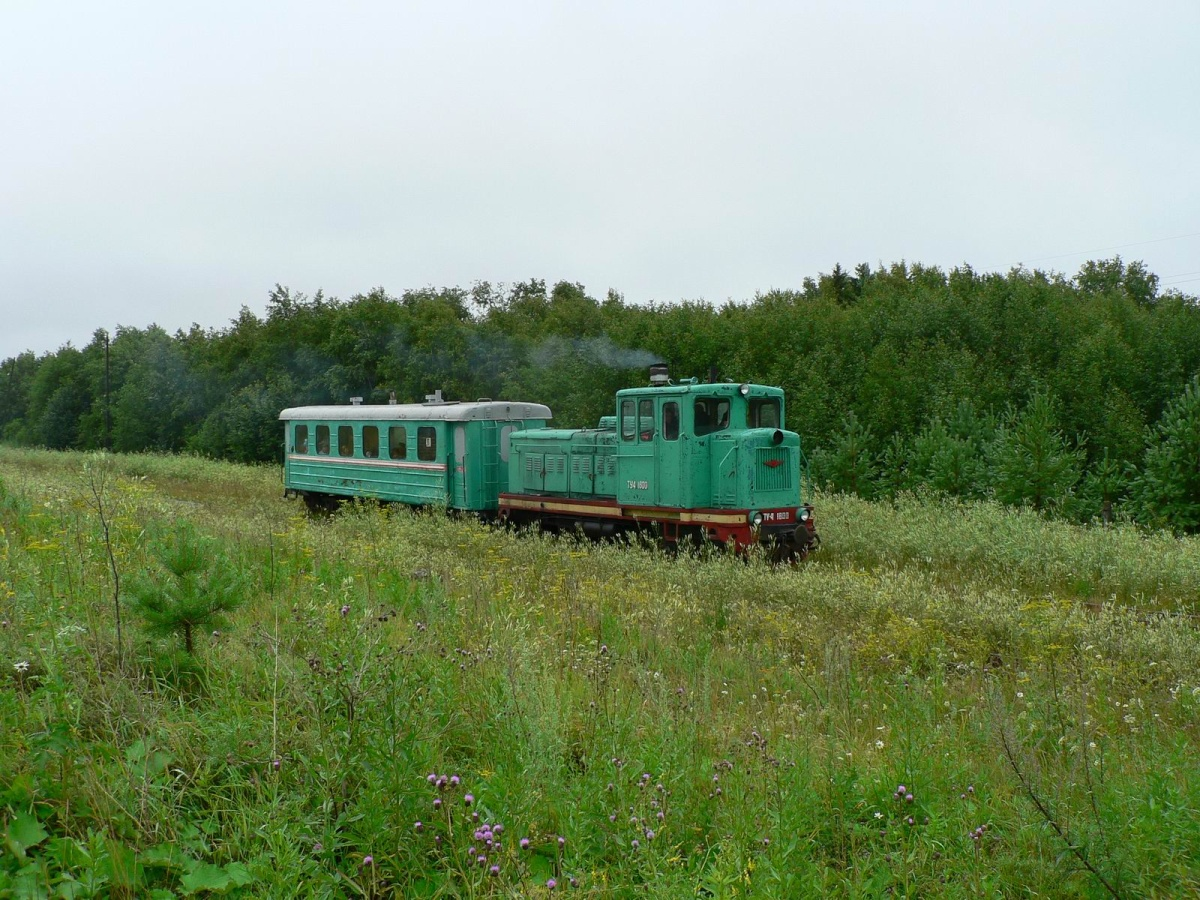
TU4-1800 with passenger train

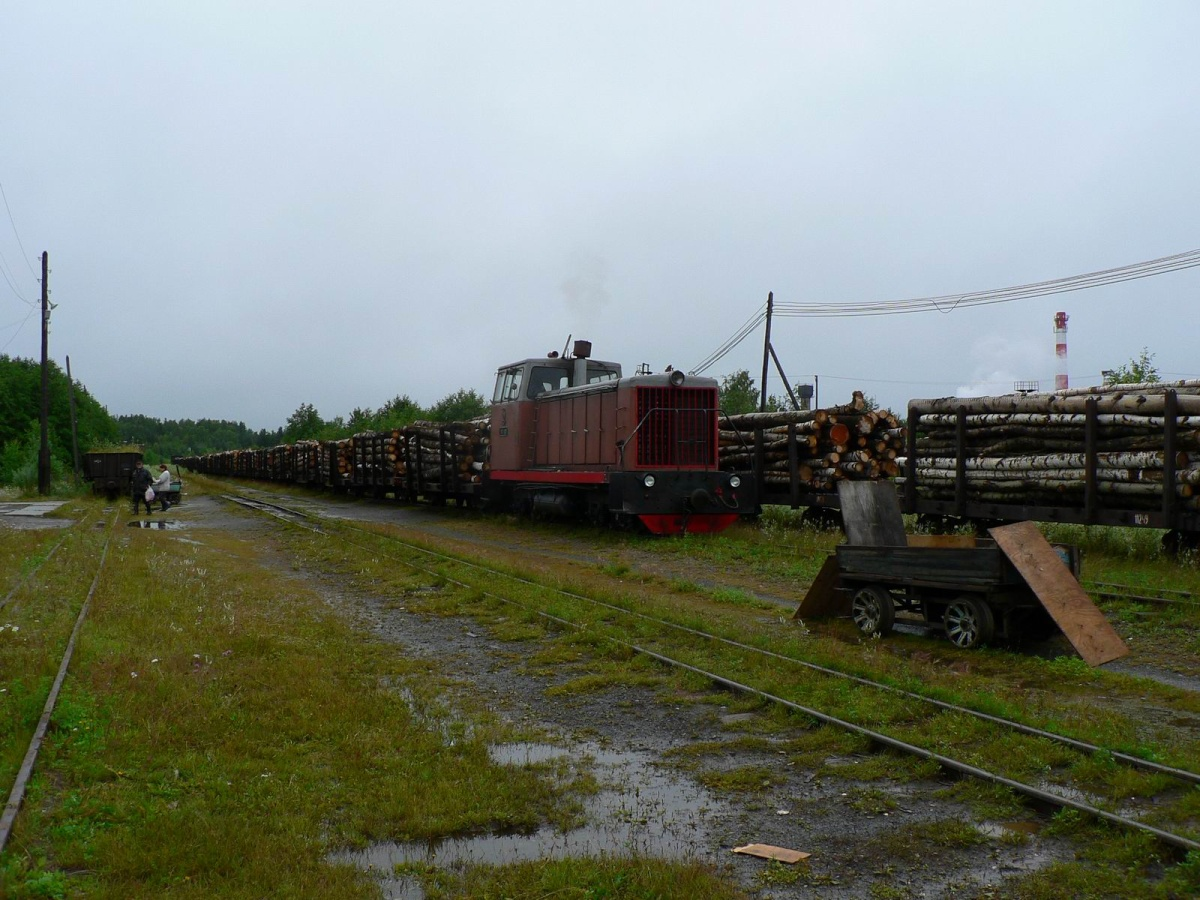
TU7-1915 with freight train

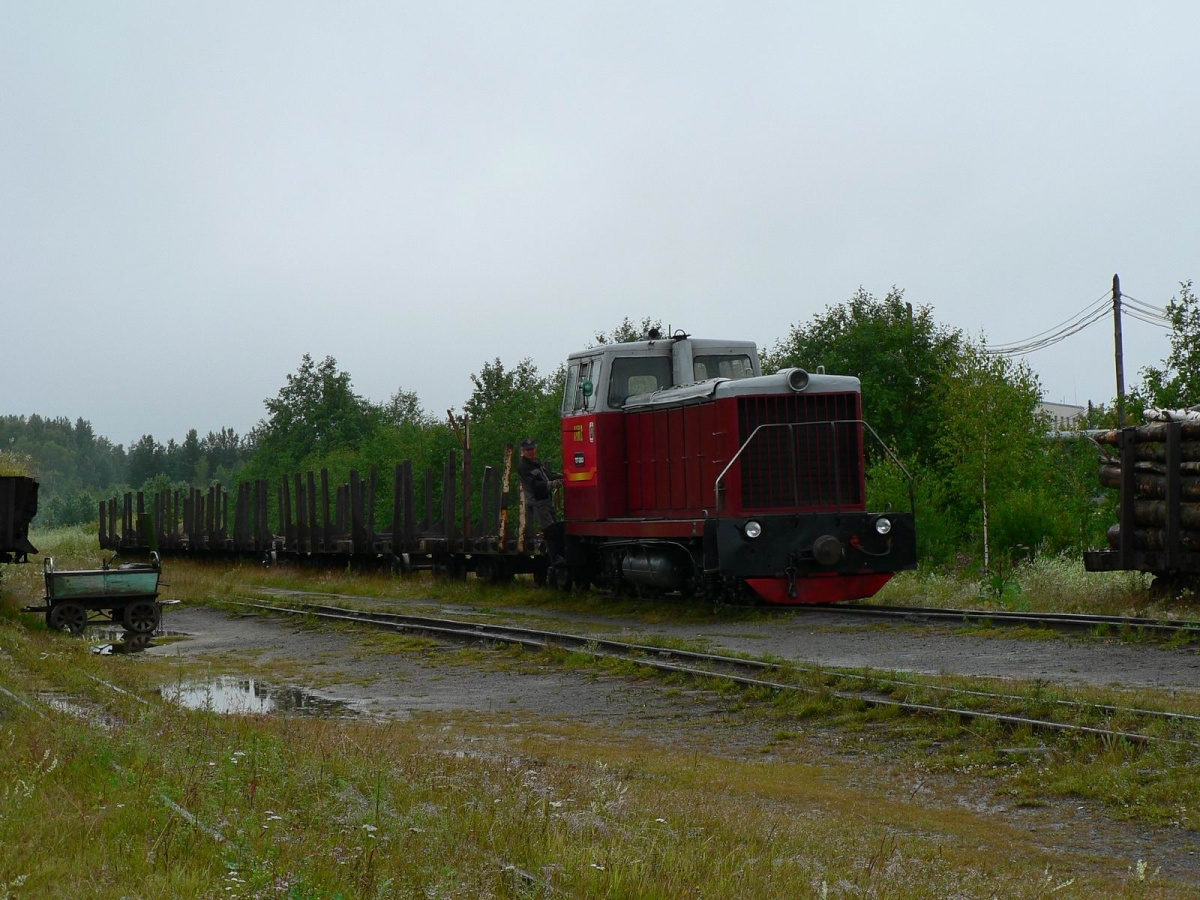
TU7-2083 with freight train

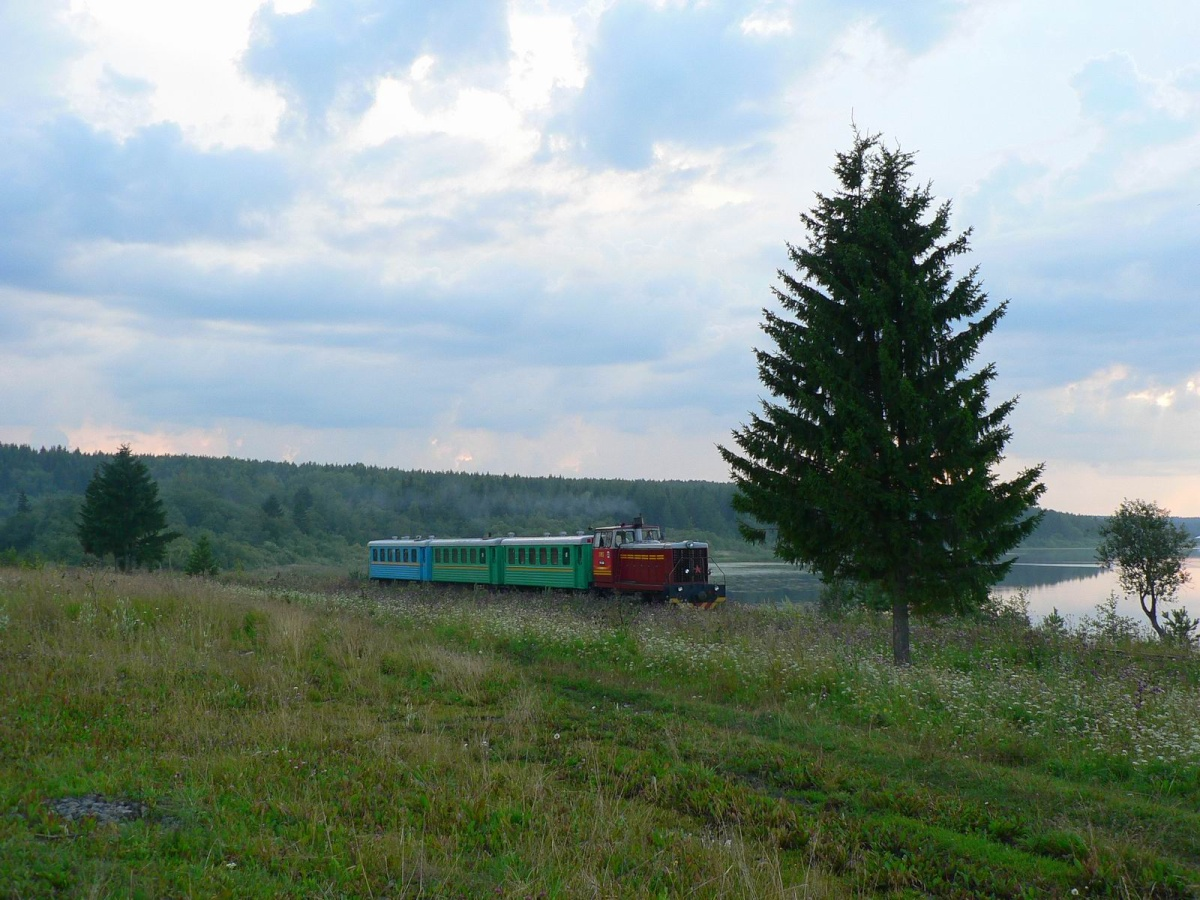
TU7–2388 with passenger train

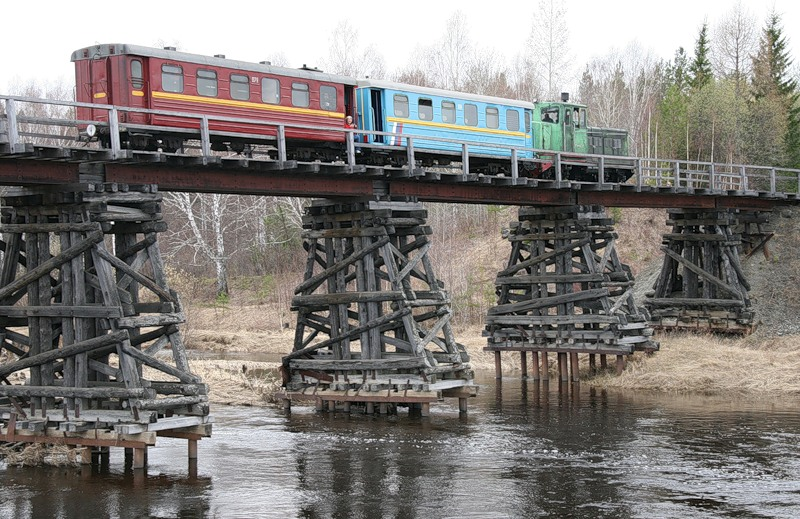
TU4-1452 hauled passenger train

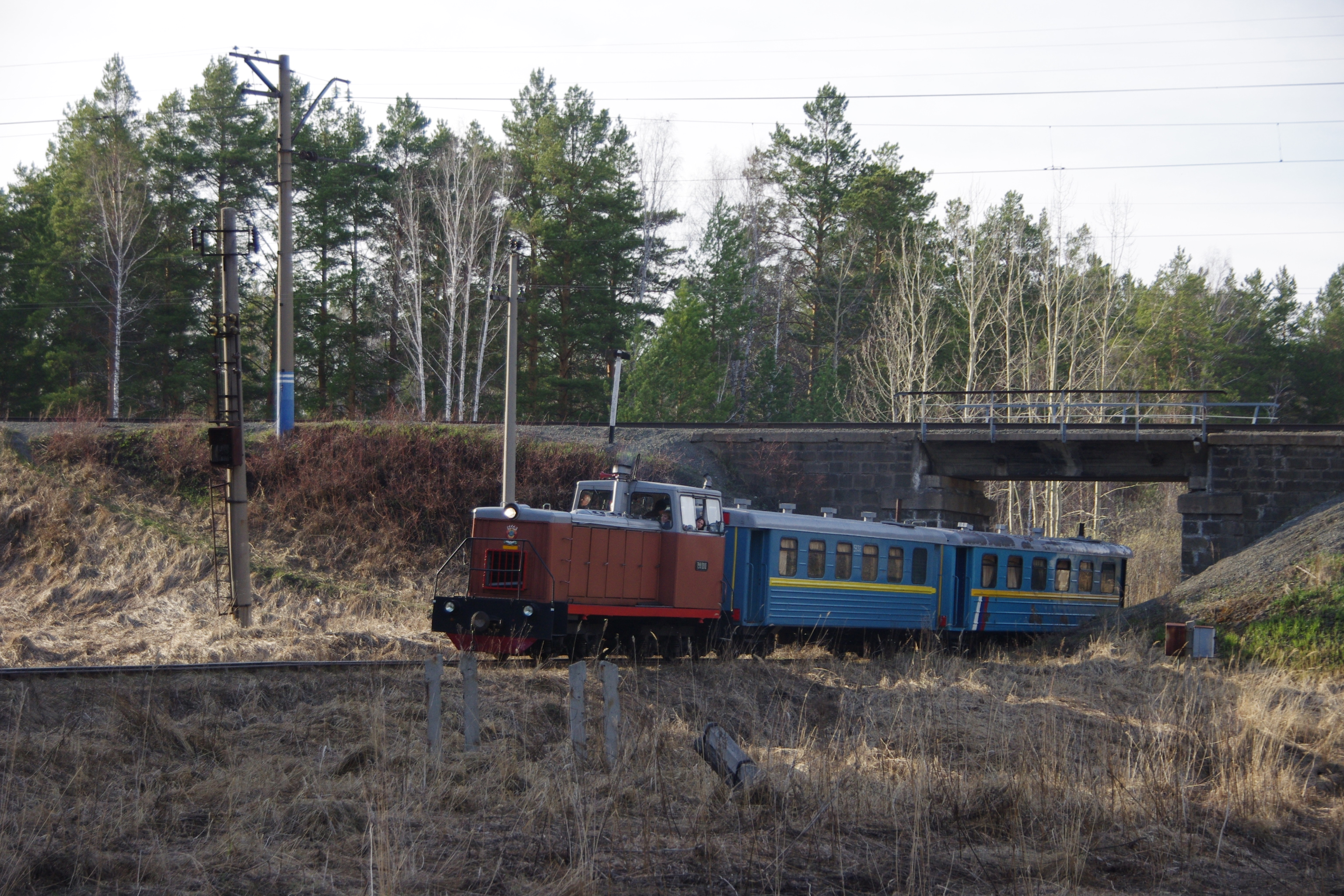
TU8-0010 with passenger train

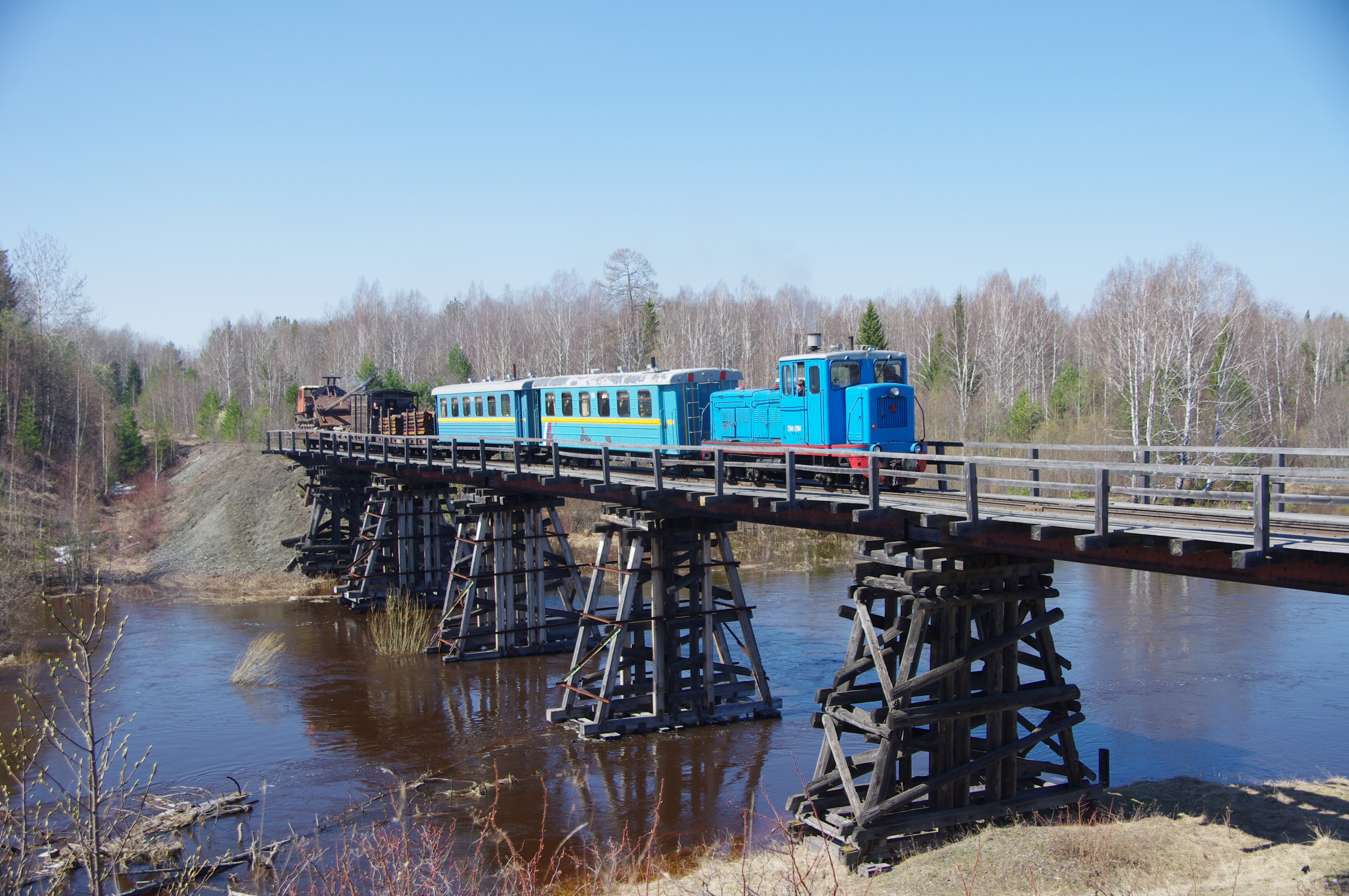
TU4-1794 with passenger train

== See also ==
- Narrow-gauge railways in Russia
