= Tyosovo peat railway =

Peat railway

Coordinates: 58.93114°N 31.06811°E

Tyosovo-1 peat railway
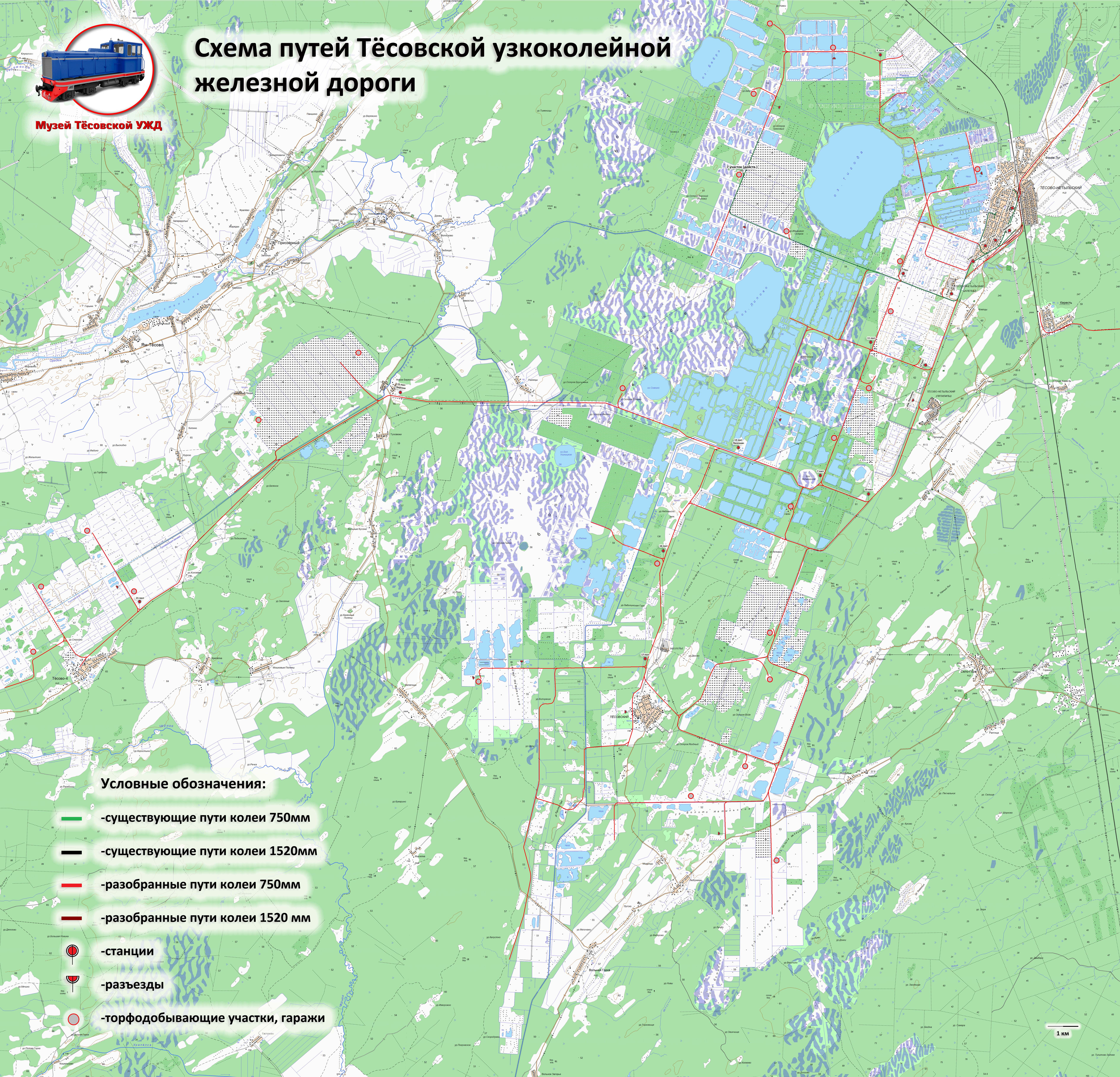

Overview
- Locale: Novgorod Oblast, Russia (management); Leningrad Oblast, Russia (production)
- Termini: Tyosovo-Netylskiy
- Website: museum-uzd.ru (in Russian)

Service
- Type: Narrow-gauge railway
- Operator(s): JSC "Tyosovo-1 peat»

History
- Opened: 1939

Technical
- Line length: 16 kilometres (9.9 mi)
- Track gauge: 750 mm (2 ft 5 1/2 in)

The Tyosovo peat railway (Russian: Тёсовская торфовозная узкоколейная железная дорога) is located in Novgorod Oblast, Russia. The peat railway was opened in 1939, and has a total length of 19 kilometres (12 mi) is, track gauge is 750 mm (2 ft 5 1/2 in) and operates year-round.

== History ==
The first 30-kilometre section of the line was opened in 1939 in the area of Novgorodsky District, Novgorod Oblast, from the village Tyosovo-Netylskiy to the swamp peat fields. The peat railway was built for hauling peat and workers and operates year-round. During World War II, the railway became a place of fierce fighting and suffered damage. After the war it was restored as soon as possible, as it was the least badly damaged of all such narrow-gauge railways around Leningrad.

As the number of extracted peat grew up in 1951 was based Tyosovskoe transport management (Russian: Тёсовское транспортное управление), which was engaged in handling and transportation of peat on the narrow-gauge railway. In the mid-1950s it began the construction of the workers' settlements Tyosovo-2 and Tyosovo-4, where were built standard depots. The station Tyosovo-1 (a.k.a. Tyosovo-Netylsky) was built rack for handling peat and a locomotive-car shed. On the road was inculcated traffic light signals, communication on locomotives. On the narrow-gauge railway, passenger traffic has been organized between settlements Tyosovo-Netylsky, Tyosovo-2 and Tyosovo-4. The original locomotive fleet were steam locomotives.

By 1970 a complete reconstruction of the narrow-gauge railway had been completed – the road laid concrete sleepers on the arrows installed actuators. On the road, introducing new travel and peat machine, the local design office is developing a new rolling stock on the narrow-gauge locomotives were TU4 and TU7. Extraction of peat has reached enormous proportions, peat worked around the clock, with more than a dozen fields exported formulations with peat by 30 or more cars each from the station. On the whole system was a total of more than 30 locomotives and railcars.

=== Current status ===
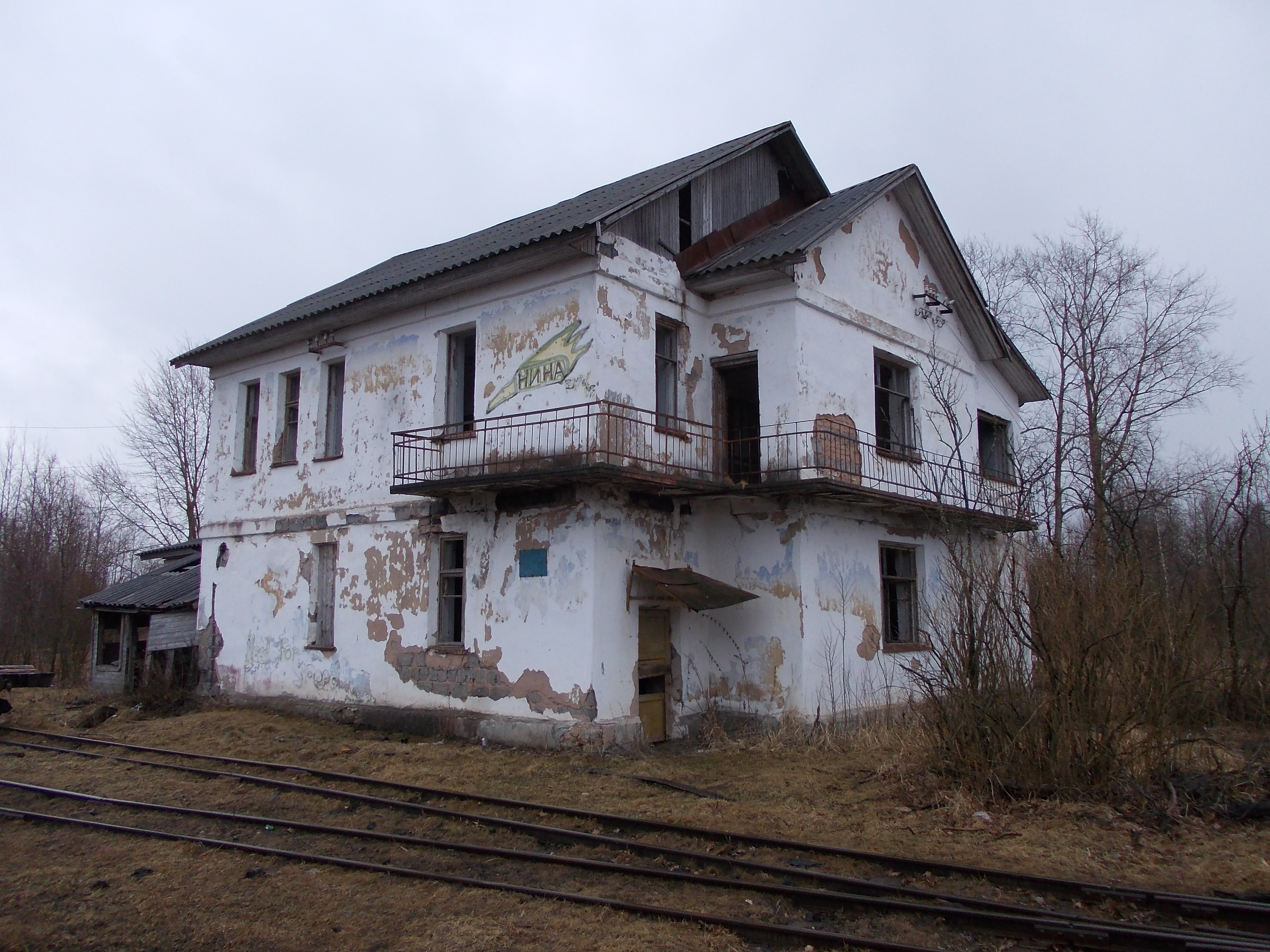
Dispatching station of Tyosovo-1 in April 2015

After perestroika Tyosovskoe TM, as well as many businesses in the country, has been liquidated and all the property transferred to several new peats. The turning point for the life of the narrow-gauge railway began in 1994 – the main consumers abandoned peat, its production fell to almost zero, it exported only for the needs of the township boilers. Rolling stock started to sell for scrap, nearly 200-kilometer narrow-gauge system is also put into scrap metal. He was pulled on the way Tyosovo-4, and in 1995 stopped traffic on Tyosovo-2. In 2002, the way there was completely sold for scrap. After a few years separate the work Peats Tyosovo-2 and Tyosovo-4 were eliminated.

Now only peat enterprise Tyosovo-1 exist. Currently, interest in peat began to emerge again as a fuel and for agriculture – and this is a chance to preserve and develop Tyosovo NGR.

Map of Tesovo peat railway (2022)

In 2015 a narrow-gauge length of the main course of the road is about 16 km, access, station tracks and dead ends – about 9 km. Extraction of peat produced regularly.

== Rolling stock ==
=== Locomotives ===
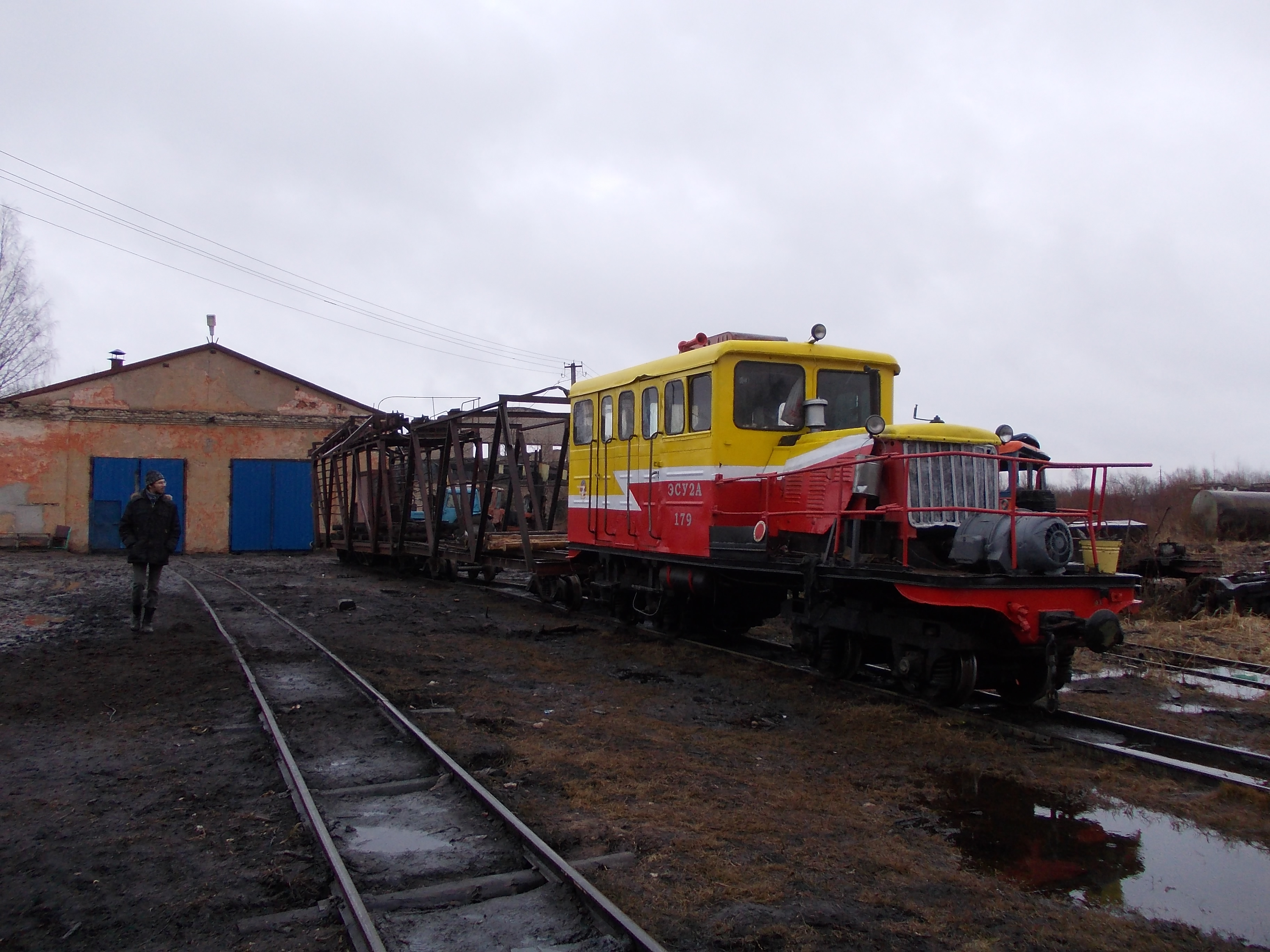
ESU2A No. 179 in a depot

- TU6P – No. 0050
- TU6A – No. 3723
- ESU2A – No. 179, 709

=== Railway cars ===
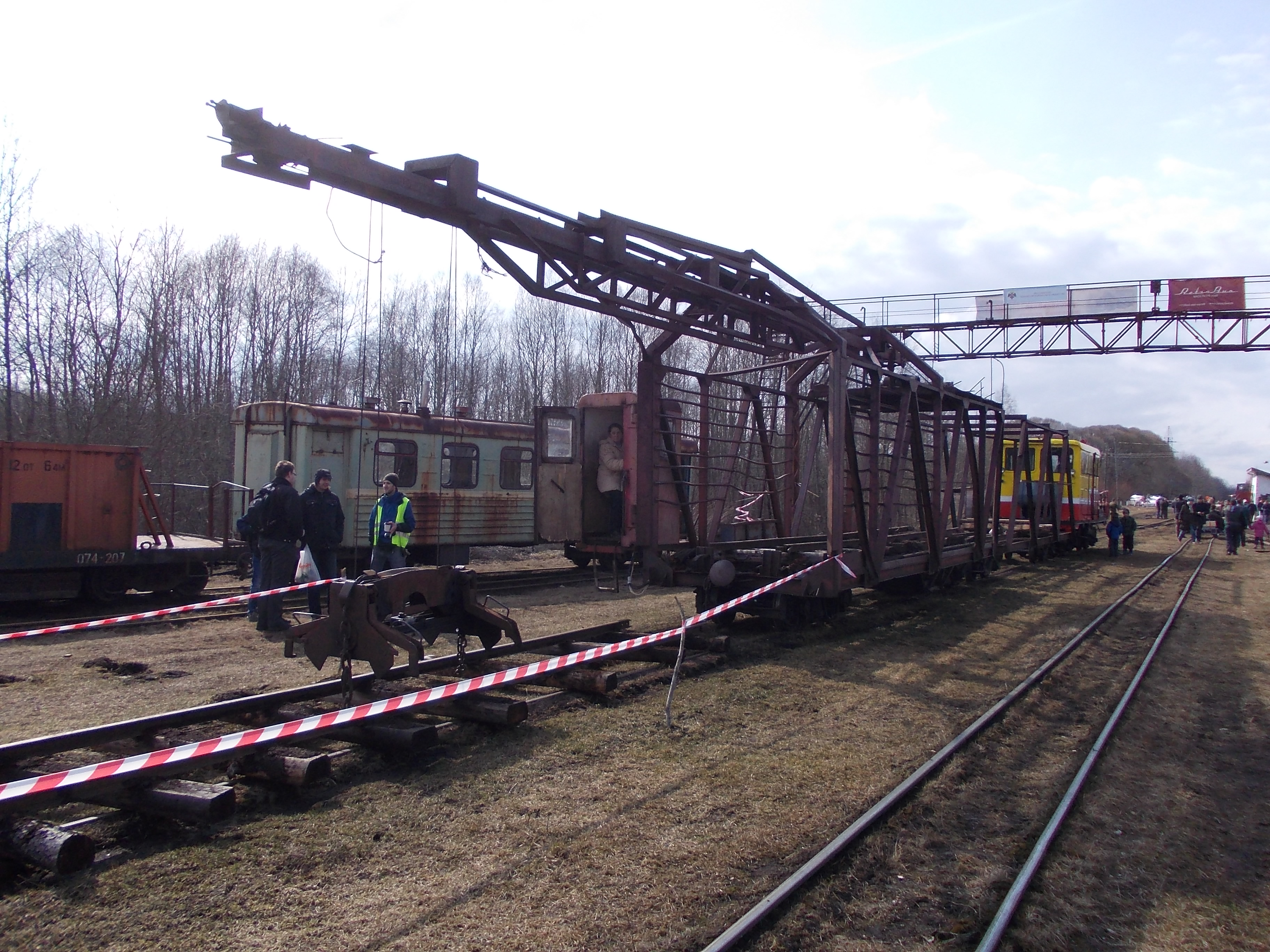
The demonstration work of PPR2MA tracklayer

- Flatcar
- Tank car
- Snowplow
- Track laying cranes
- Passenger car PV40
- Open wagon for peat TSV6A
- Hopper car to transport track ballast

== Tyosovo Railway Museum ==
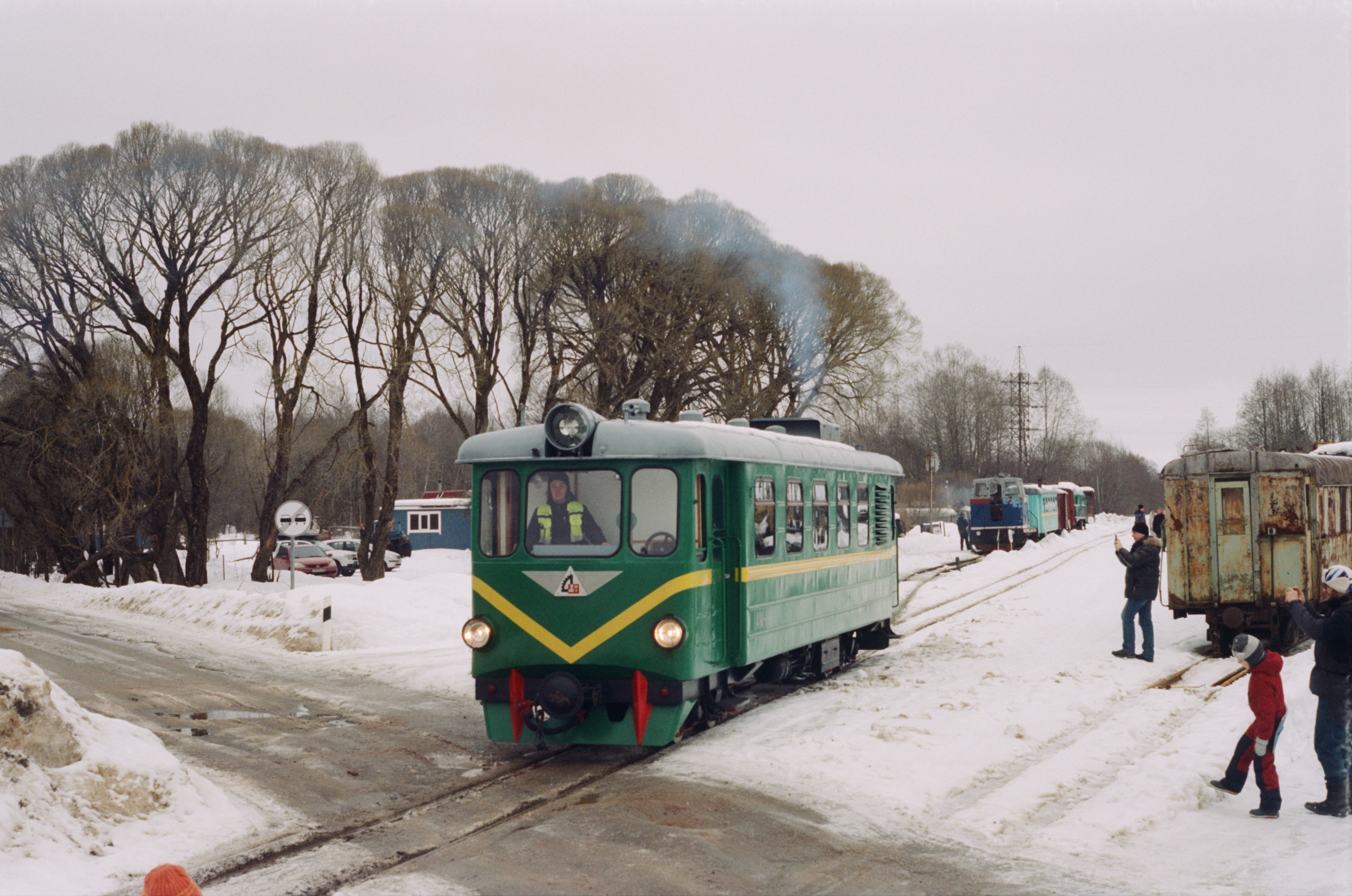
AM1 railcar in museum station (2022)

The Tyosovo Railway Museum is the outdoor railway museum in Novgorod Oblast, located in Tyosovo-Netylskiy, opened in 2014. The museum is located close to the Tyosovo-1 station, the major attraction of the village Tyosovo-Netylskiy. It displays various historical rolling stock and is used for military-historical festivals.

=== Museum's collection ===
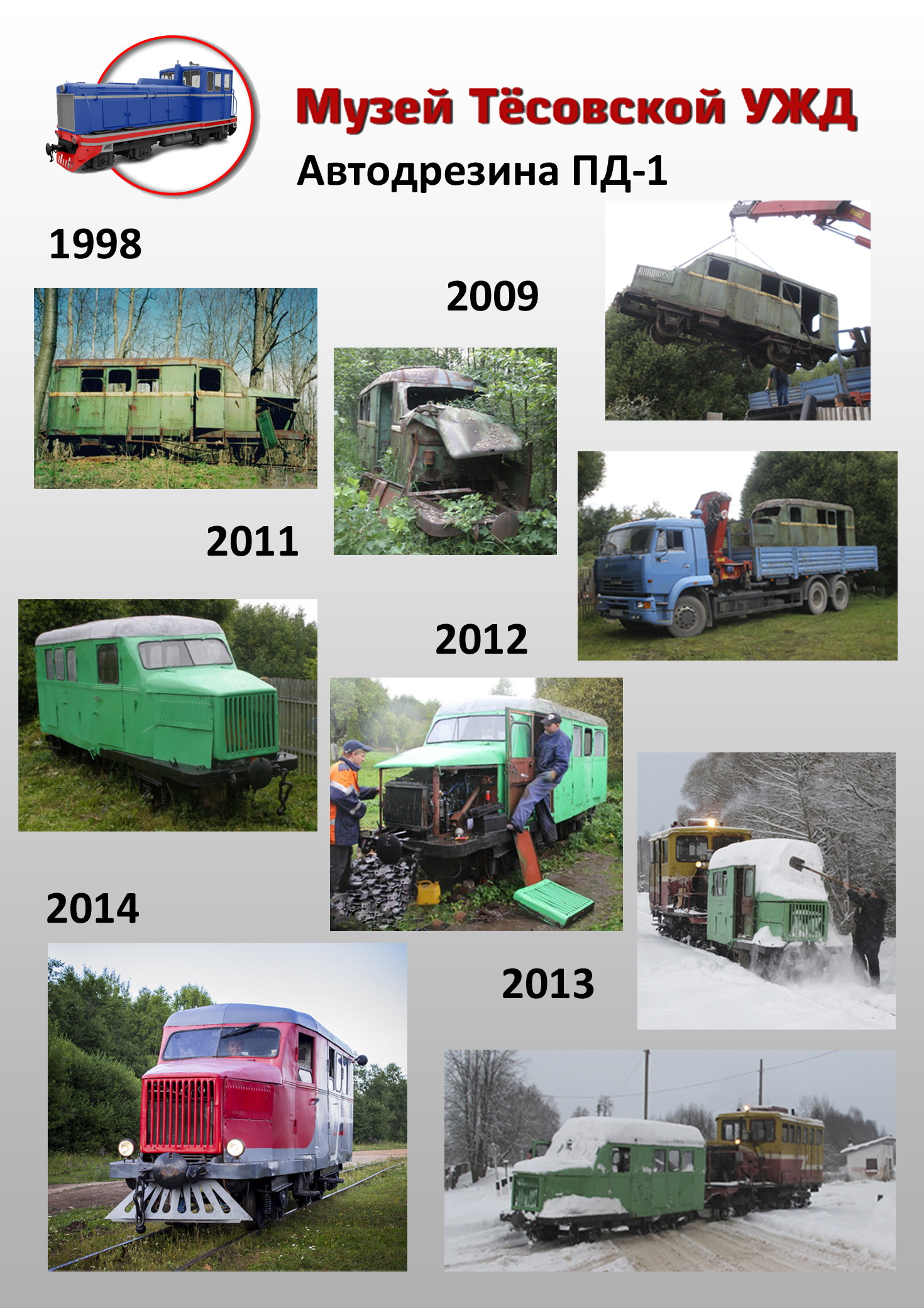
Draisine PD-1-353

=== Locomotives and draisines ===
- TU4 – No. 1030
- TU4 – No. 2630
- Draisine – PD-1-353
- Draisine – TD-5u
- Draisine – armored TD-5u for military-historical festivals

=== Railway car ===
- Passenger car – PV40
- Tank cars – VC20
- Hopper car 42-074

== See also ==
- Narrow-gauge railways in Russia
- List of Russian narrow-gauge railways rolling stock
