= Oparinskaya narrow-gauge railway =

Coordinates: 59.84388°N 48.30036°E

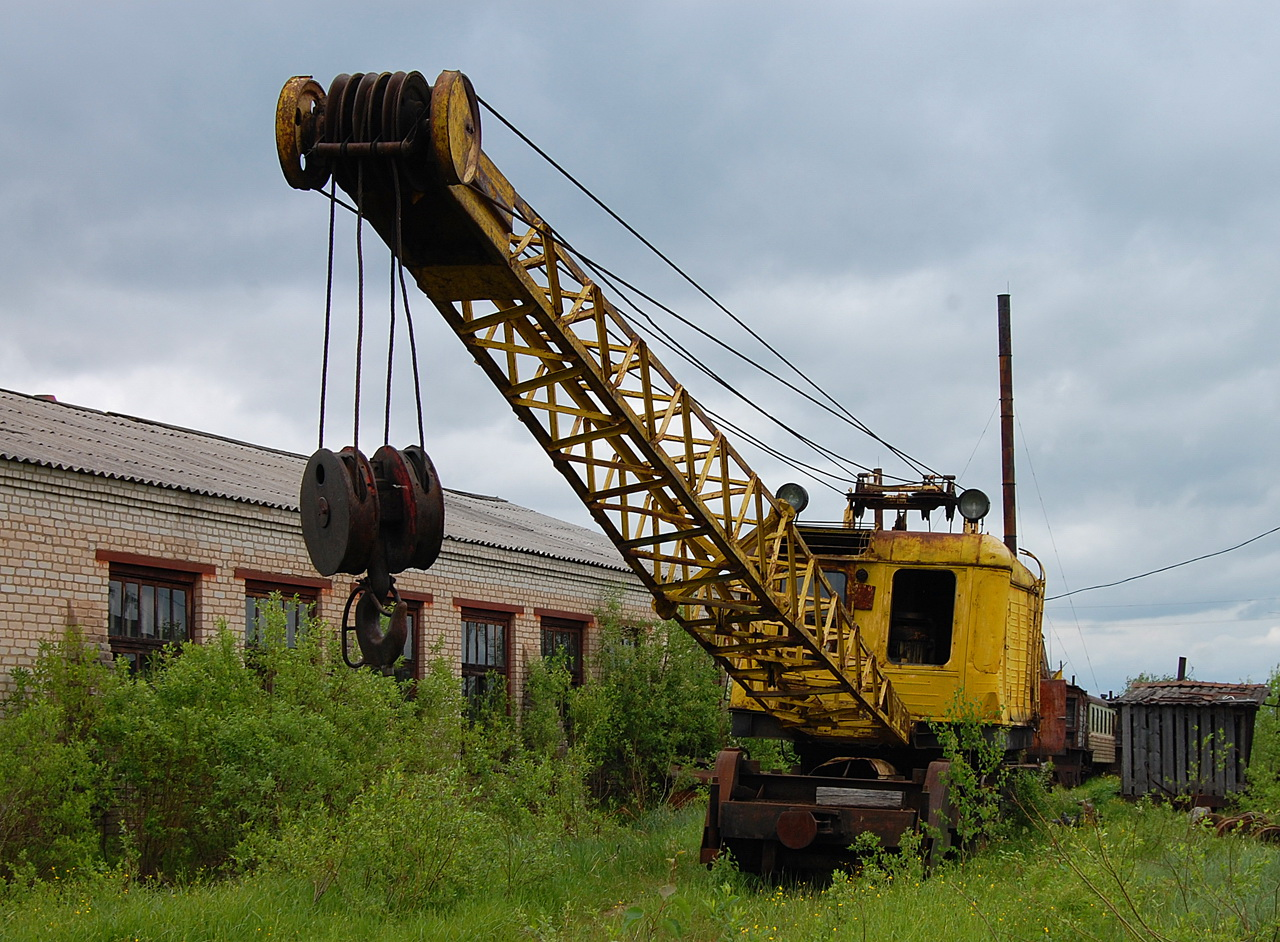

Overview
- Locale: Kirov Oblast, Russia
- Termini: Oparino

Service
- Type: Narrow-gauge railway
- Operator: Holding company «Oparinskyi LPH»

History
- Opened: 1952

Technical
- Line length: 76 kilometres (47 mi)
- Track gauge: 750 mm (2 ft 5 1/2 in)
Route map
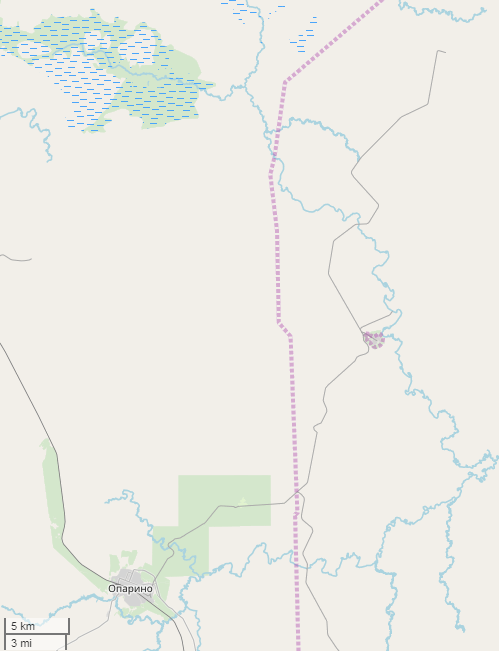

The Oparinskaya narrow-gauge railway is a narrow-gauge railway in Kirov Oblast, Russia, built as an industrial railway (forest railway) for logging operations. The forest railway was opened in 1952, has a total length of 76 kilometres (47 mi) and is operational as of 2016, the track gauge is 750 mm (2 ft 5 1/2 in) and operates year-round.

== Current status ==
Planning for the railway began in 1952 and building began in 1952-1955. In 1955 regular wood transport on the railway started, between Oparino and Forest villages. The Oparinskaya forestry railway's first line was constructed in 1952, in the area of Oparinsky District in Kirov Oblast from the village Oparino. The total length of the Oparinskaya railway at the peak of its development exceeded 100 kilometres (62 mi), of which 76 kilometres (47 mi) is currently operational. The railway operates scheduled freight services from Oparino, used for forestry tasks such as the transportation of felled logs and forestry workers. In 2016, repairs are being made to the track.

== Rolling stock ==
=== Locomotives ===
- TU4 – № 2440
- TU6A – № 1032, 3065, 3751
- TU6D – № 0377
- TU7A – № 2351, 2761, 3308
- TU8 – № 0514

=== Railroad car ===
- Boxcar
- Tank car
- Dining car
- Passenger car
- Side-tipping wagons
- Railway log-car and flatcar
- Hopper car to transport track ballast

=== Work trains ===
- Snowplow
- Finnish crane 5E – № 1724 Valmet

== See also ==
- Narrow-gauge railways in Russia
- List of Russian narrow-gauge railways rolling stock
