= TU10 diesel locomotive =

TU10 (ТУ10 )
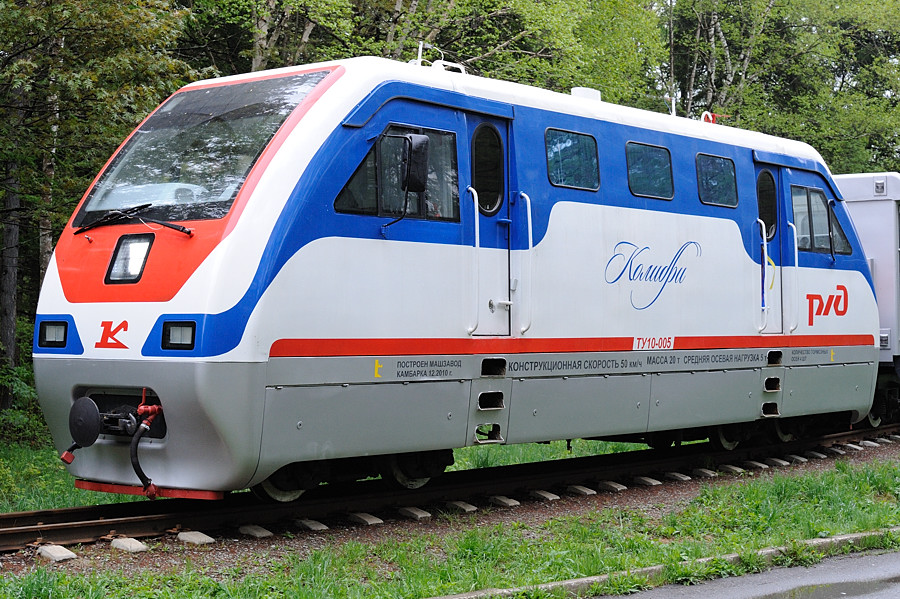
- TU10-005 of the Children's Railway Sakhalin
Type and origin
- Builder: Kambarka Engineering Works
- Model: JaMZ 6563.10 (ЯМЗ 6563.10)
- Build date: Since 2010
- Total produced: 28 (as of 06/2015)
Specifications
- Configuration
  - UIC: B' B'
- Gauge: 750 mm (2 ft 6 in)
- Length
  - Over couplers: 11,040 mm (36 ft 3 in)
- Service weight: 20 t (19.7 long tons; 22.0 short tons)
- Fuel type: Diesel
- Transmission: 4 gear hydraulic gear box of the Type D864.5 by Voith
Performance figures
- Maximum speed: 50 km/h (31 mph)
- Installed power: 169 kW (227 hp) at 1,900 rpm
Career
- Numbers: TU10-001 to TU10-030

The TU10 locomotives (Russian TУ10) of the Russian Railways (RŽD) are narrow gauge diesel locomotives intended for children's railways.

== History ==
The children's railways or pioneer railways were used for extracurricular education, where adolescents learned railway professions. This phenomenon originated in the USSR and was greatly developed in Soviet times. However, existing children's railways continued to be used, and new tracks and locomotives were built even after the break-down of the Soviet Union.

Most of these railways operate diesel engines, but some of them occasionally fire up old steam locomotives. Some TU2 diesel locomotives from the 1950s are still being used, although most of them have been replaced by TU7 diesel locomotives or TU7A diesel locomotives. Narrow gauge locomotive production was discontinued in the 2000s due to the decline of narrow-gauge railways in Russia, such as forest railways, peat railways and industrial railways, which led to a lack of suitable new or second-hand locomotives for children's railways.

== Development of the TU10 ==
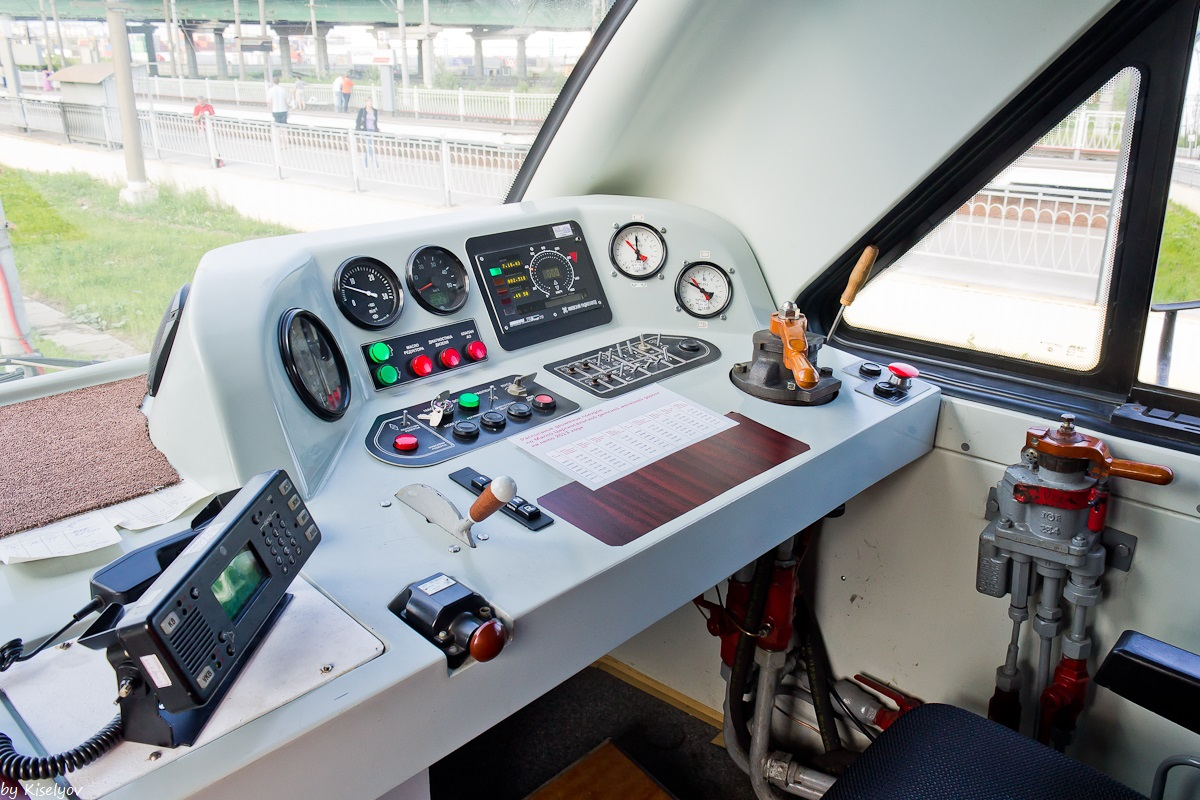
Dashboard

The Kambarka Engineering Works began in 2008 with the development of a modern diesel locomotive specifically for use on children's railways. Using experience with older models, the following changes were implemented: the locomotives have two equal cabs with an ergonomically designed dashboard and HVAC (heating, ventilation, air condition), a JaMZ 6563.10 (ЯМЗ 6563.10) diesel engine with 169 kW (227 hp) at 1,900 rpm, and a four gear Voith Type D864.5 hydraulic gearbox. The exhaust emissions are in line with the Euro-3 standard. Apart from a computer-assisted control and detection system, they have also a KLUB-UP (КЛУБ-УП) train control system with GPS. The locomotives have a modern wireless communication system RVS-1-01 (РВС-1-01) and an automatic fire detection and extinguishing system.

The prototype was unveiled in spring 2010, and delivered in August 2010 to St Petersburg. Most of the locomotives were painted in a variation to a common RŽD livery in the Russian national colours, except TU10-002 of Nowomoskowsk. 30 ТУ10 units have been built as of June 2015.

== Use ==
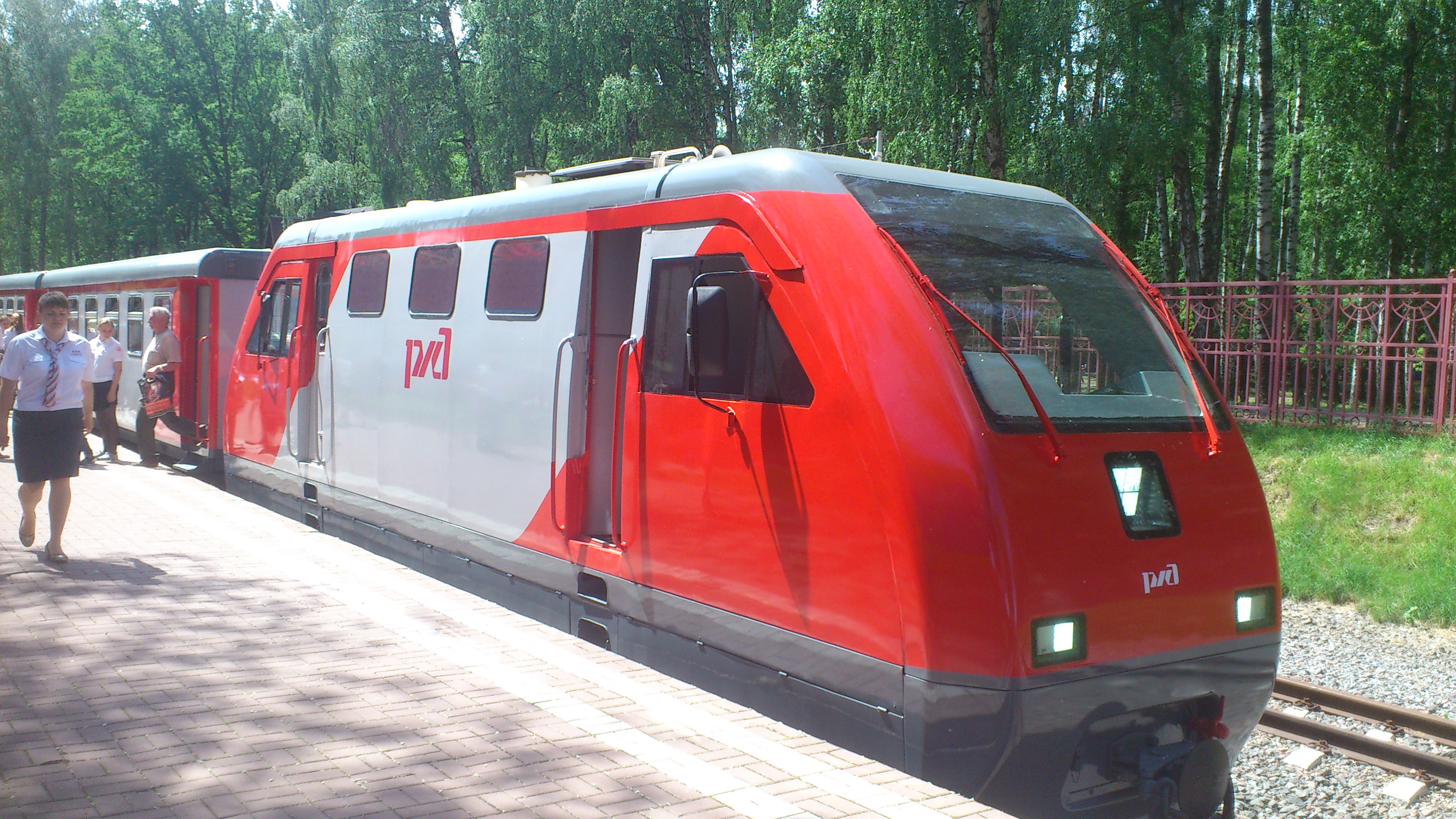
TU10-002 in Novomoskovsk

TU10-001 of the children's railway St Petersburg

TU10-013 of the children's railway Jekaterinburg

The TU10 diesel locomotives are currently being used on the following railways:

Locomotive	Built in	Location
TU10-001	2010	St Petersburg
TU10-002	2010	Novomoskovsk
TU10-003	2010	Nizhny Novgorod
TU10-004	2010	Volgograd
TU10-005	2010	Children's Railway Sakhalin, Yuzhno-Sakhalinsk
TU10-006	2011	Small West Siberian Railway, Novosibirsk
TU10-007	2011	Kurgan
TU10-008	2011	Penza
TU10-009	2011	Vladikavkaz
TU10-010	2011	Ufa
TU10-011	2012	Tyumen
TU10-012	2012	Chita
TU10-013	2012	Yekaterinburg children railway
TU10-014	2012	Belogorsk
TU10-015	2012	Chelyabinsk
TU10-016	2012	Irkutsk
TU10-017	2012	Far East Children's Railway, Chabarovsk
TU10-018	2012	Novomoskovsk
TU10-019	2013	Rostov
TU10-020	2013	Liski
TU10-021	2013	Orenburg
TU10-022	2013	Kazan
TU10-023	2014	Kemerovo
TU10-024	2014	Jaroslavl
TU10-025	2014	St Petersburg
TU10-026	2014	Rostov
TU10-027	2015	Trans-Siberian Railway
TU10-028	2015	Orenburg
TU10-029	2015	Tyumen
TU10-030	2015	St Petersburg
