= Children's Railway Sakhalin =

Coordinates: 46.965992°N 142.753741°E

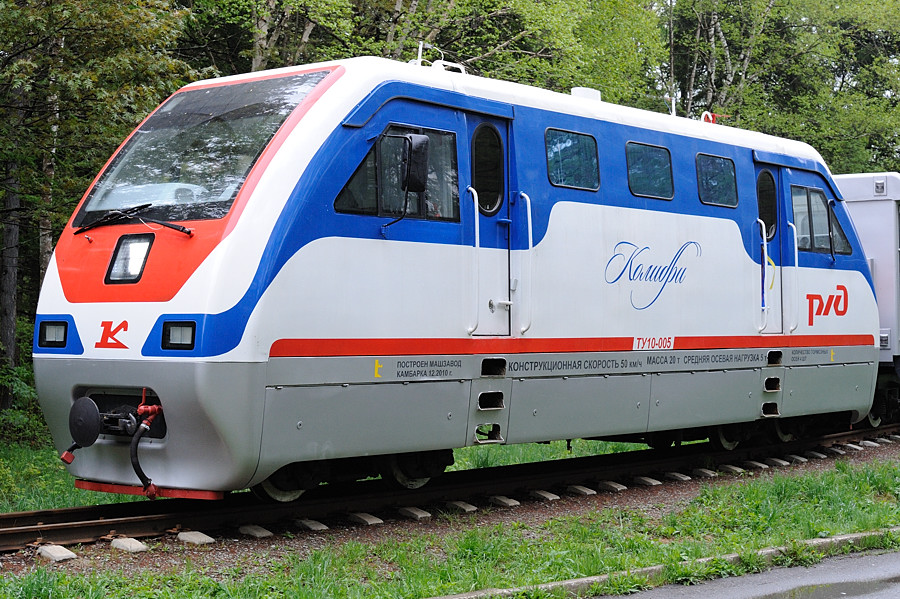
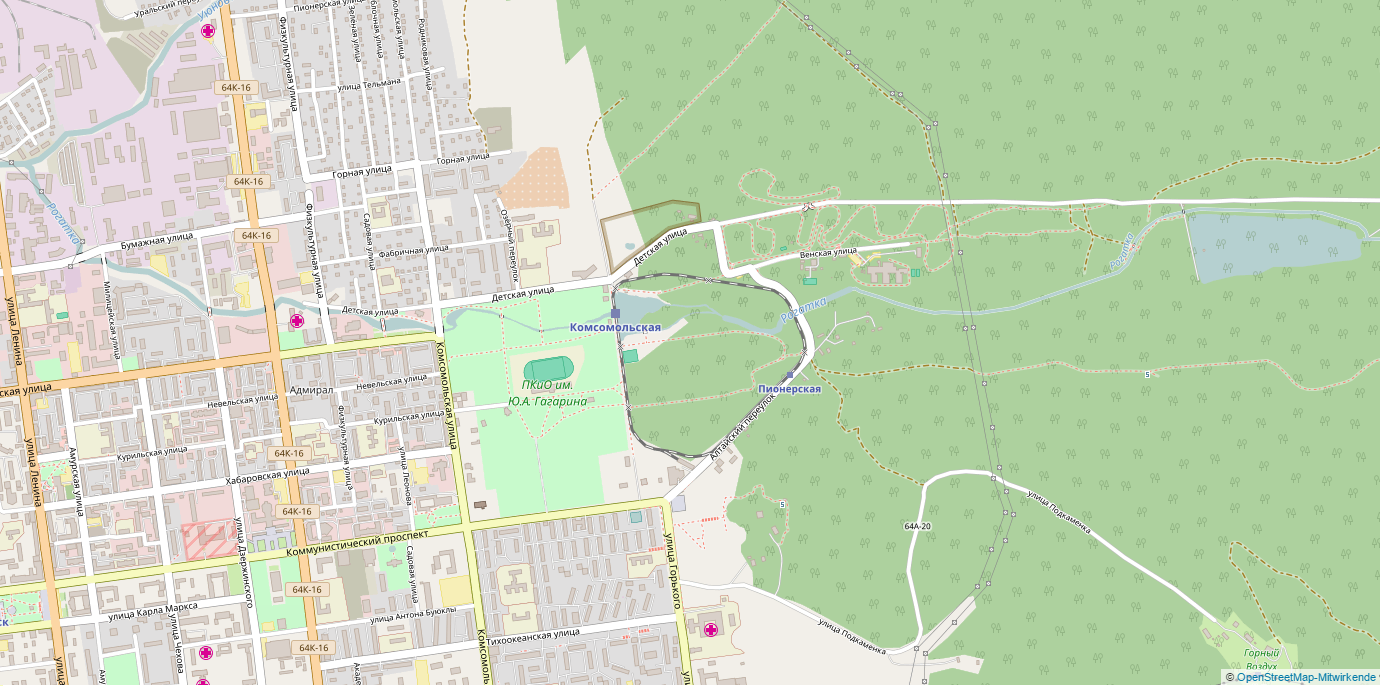
- TU10 diesel locomotive-005 Map of the track

Technical
- Line length: 2.2 km (1.4 mi)
- Track gauge: 750 mm (30 in)

The Children's Railway Sakhalin (Russian: Южно-Сахалинская детская железная дорога) is a narrow gauge miniature railway in the Russian city Yuzhno-Sakhalinsk in Sakhalin Oblast. The 2.0 km circular track with a 200 m-long (660 ft) branch into the depot was opened on 6 June 1954 as one of the many pioneer railways in the USSR. It is still in use.

== Track ==
Levelling the track required some efforts due to the steep hills. The track crosses a river twice over two steel bridges with large spans of 9 and 15 metres (49 ft).

The station Komsomolskaja (станция Комсомольская) in the east and the halt Pioneer (остановочный пункт Пионер) in the west have wooden station buildings and the halt has even a wooden platform.

Along Komsomolskaja Road the track follows a lake only a few metres from its shore. A 1.73 m-high (5.7 ft) concrete wall was built 1½ to 2 metres away from the rails in the mid 1970s, to mitigate the risk of erosion.

== History ==
The planning began in 1953. The idea was supported by the regional party and the Komsomol, but it was only implemented very slowly. Volunteers refurbished a steam locomotive and some waggons and prepared the signalling and paraphernalia. Members of the Komsomol supported the project, which was also reviewed with great interest by the General Director of the South Sakhalin Railways Michail Olona. The track in the park for culture and relaxation, which is named after the cosmonaut Yuri Gagarin, was inaugurated on 6 June 1954. Nikita Khrushchev, the General Secretary of the Central Committee of the Communist Party of the Soviet Union reacted adversely about its construction, which he saw as a waste of public resources, as it became known only 40 years later. In the first year the track was used in counter-clockwise direction. In the subsequent year, 1955, the steam locomotive was turned around on a temporary turning wye. Initially the steam locomotive UK-159-238 was used, until it was taken out of use in 1959.

Originally an electric token system was used, which was replaced by half automatic signal locking and finally, as the country's first children's railroad, with automatic signal locking. The diesel locomotive TU2-029 was used since 1971 and the TU2-127 since 1982. In 2009 the diesel locomotive TU7A-3351 and several new carriages were acquired and in 2011 the diesel locomotive TU10-005.

== See also ==
- Children's Railway (disambiguation)
