= Small West Siberian Railway =

Children's railway in Russia

Coordinates: 55.053286°N 82.837413°E

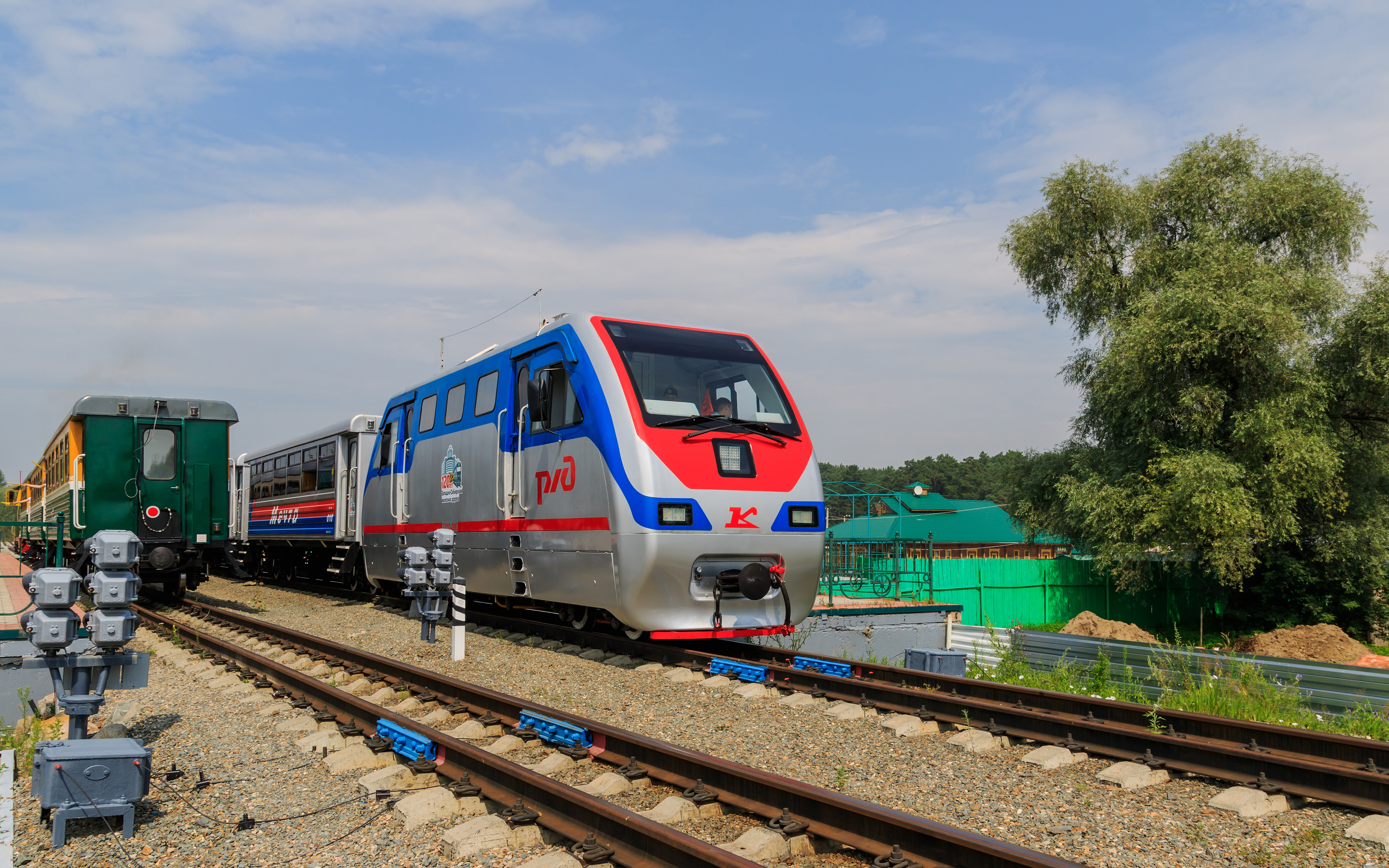
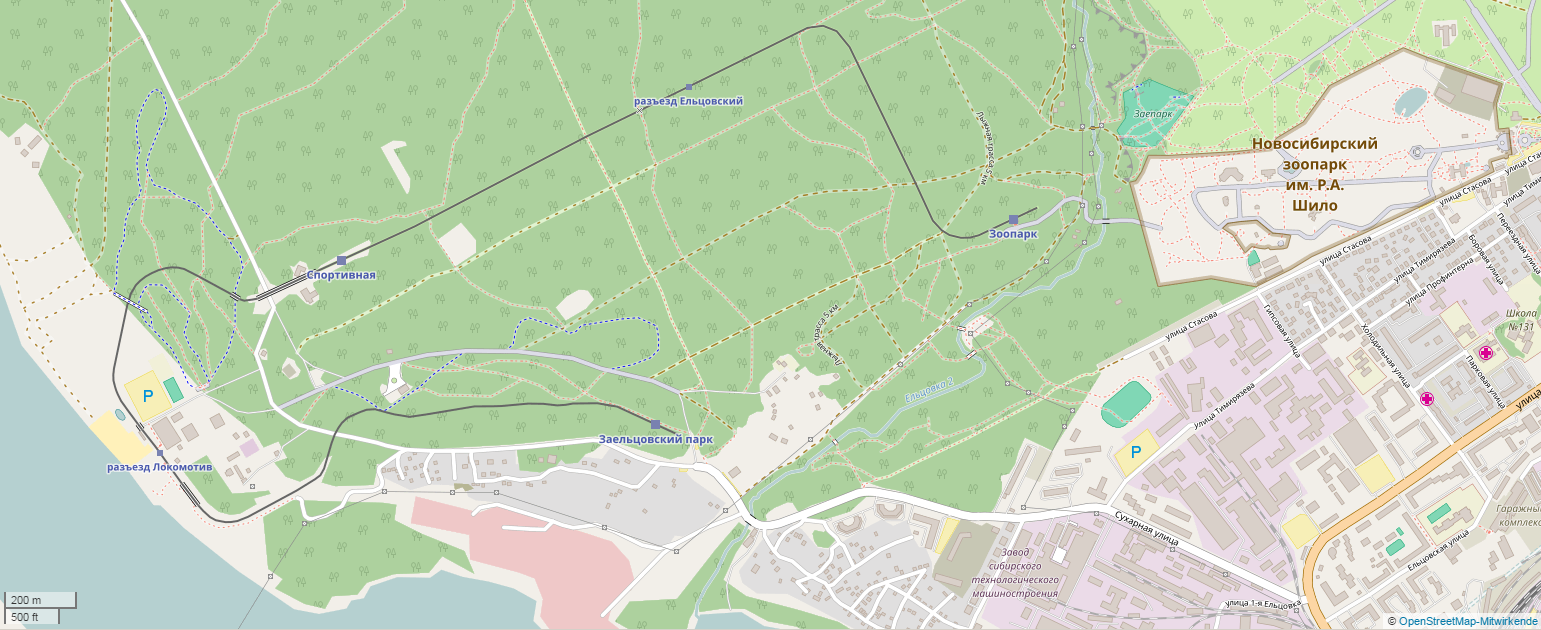
- TU10 diesel locomotive – № TU10-006 Map of the track

Technical
- Line length: 5.3 km (3.3 miles)
- Track gauge: 750 mm (30 in)

The Small West Siberian Railway or Novosibirsk Children's Railway (Russian: Малая Западно-Сибирская железная дорога, Malaya Zapadno-Sibirskaya zheleznaya doroga) is a narrow gauge miniature railway in the Russian city Novosibirsk. The first section of the railway line was opened on 4 June 2005 as one of the many children's railways in Russia. It is still in use every day in summer except Mondays.

== Route ==
The railway has a length of 5.3 km (3.3 miles) with five stations.

== History ==
The decision to build a children's railway in Novosibirsk, was announced in August 2003 by the West Siberian Railway together with the city council of Novosibirsk, when the foundation stone was laid in Zayeltsovsky Park, although the planning had not yet been fully completed. The design of the track was contracted to the institutions Sibgiprotrans and Zheldorproekt.

On 4 June 2005 the first phase of the children's railway with a length of 2,630 m (2,880 yd) was inaugurated. It was formally taken in use on 30 June 2005 by the Director of the West Siberian Railway as the 23rd children's railway of Russia. The first phase contained a more than 200 m (220 yd) long steel pier, the stations Zoopark and Sportivnaya, a training centre at the Sportivnaya station as well as the halt Razyezd Eltsovskiy.

In summer 2005 only one train operated. The train had one locomotive at each end, and could change direction without de-coupling the locomotives. On 14 November 2005 the President of the Russian Railways Vladimir Yakunin visited the railway.

Starting from 6 August 2006 the second phase with a length of 2,670 m (2,920 yd) was constructed by the Russian Railways and the city council. The second phase contains a more than 300 m (330 yd) long steel pier, two bridges, Zayeltsovskiy Park Station and Razyezd Lokomotiv Halt.

In 2015 the railway announced at its 10th anniversary that it had transported more than 480,000 passengers.

== Rolling stock ==
=== Locomotives ===
The children's railway operates three TU7A diesel locomotives with a power of 294 kW (400 hp) each and a weight of 24 t as well as a newer TU10 diesel locomotive with a power of 170 kW (230 hp). Their serial numbers are as follows:

- TU7A diesel locomotive – № 3338, № 3339 and № 3343
- TU10 diesel locomotive – № TU10-006

=== Carriages ===
There are also six passenger carriages of Type 20,0011 and 048-051 Metrovagonmash (Метровагонмаш) and three of Type 43-0011 Kambarka (Камбарска) an eight-wheeler flat waggon for track maintenance in use. Each train has three passenger carriages. Each car has 36 seats at a weight of 11.0 or 12.5 t and a length from buffer to buffer of 11.1 m (36 ft) and a width of 2.4 m (7.9 ft).

The trains have the names Skazka (Сказка, "fairy tale"), Yunost (Юность, "Youth"), Sibiryak (Сибиряк, "Siberian") and Mechta (Мечта, "Dream").

== Operation ==
The trains run daily with the exception of Mondays during the season from 1 June to 30 September.

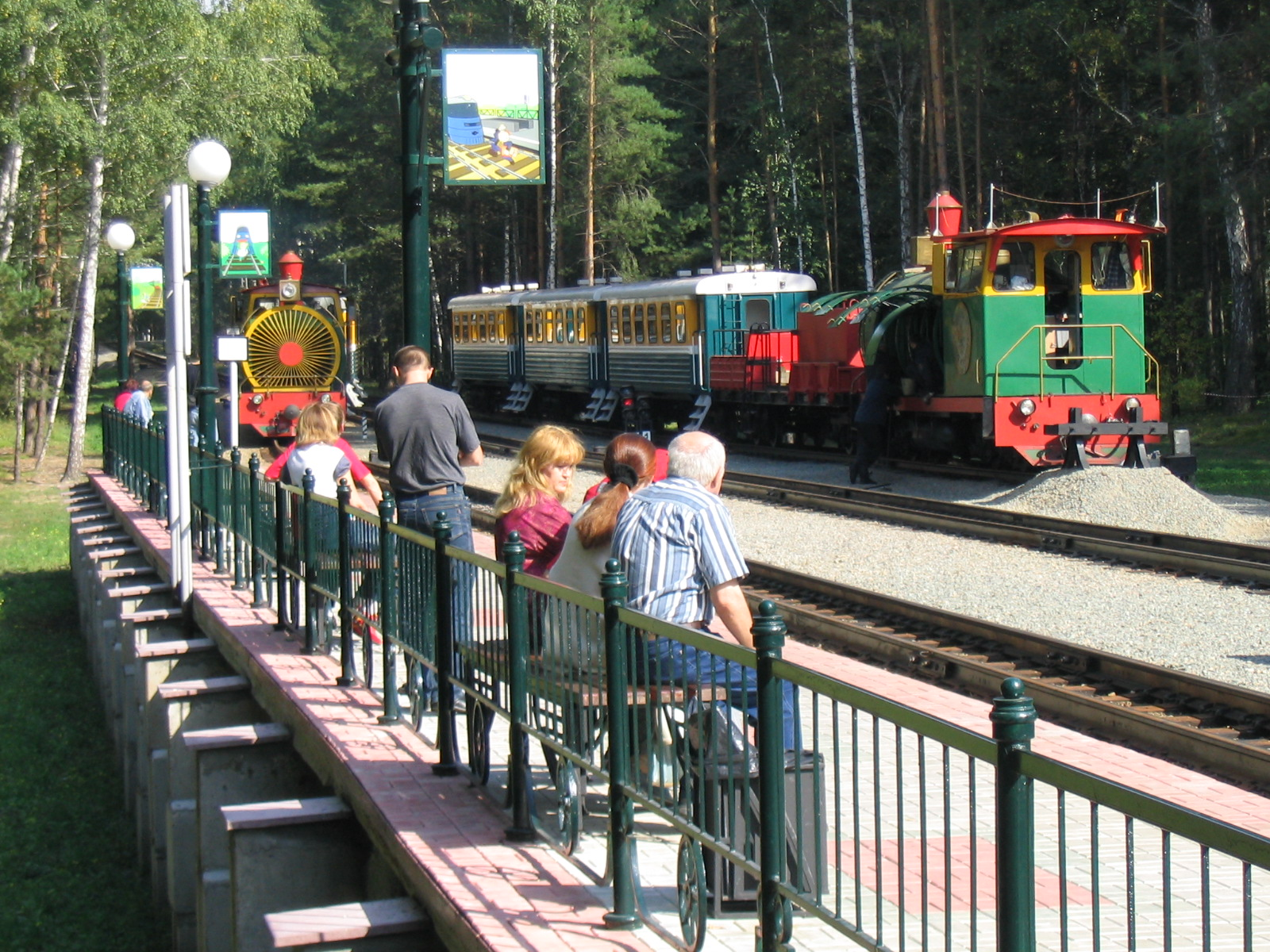
Modified diesel locomotives

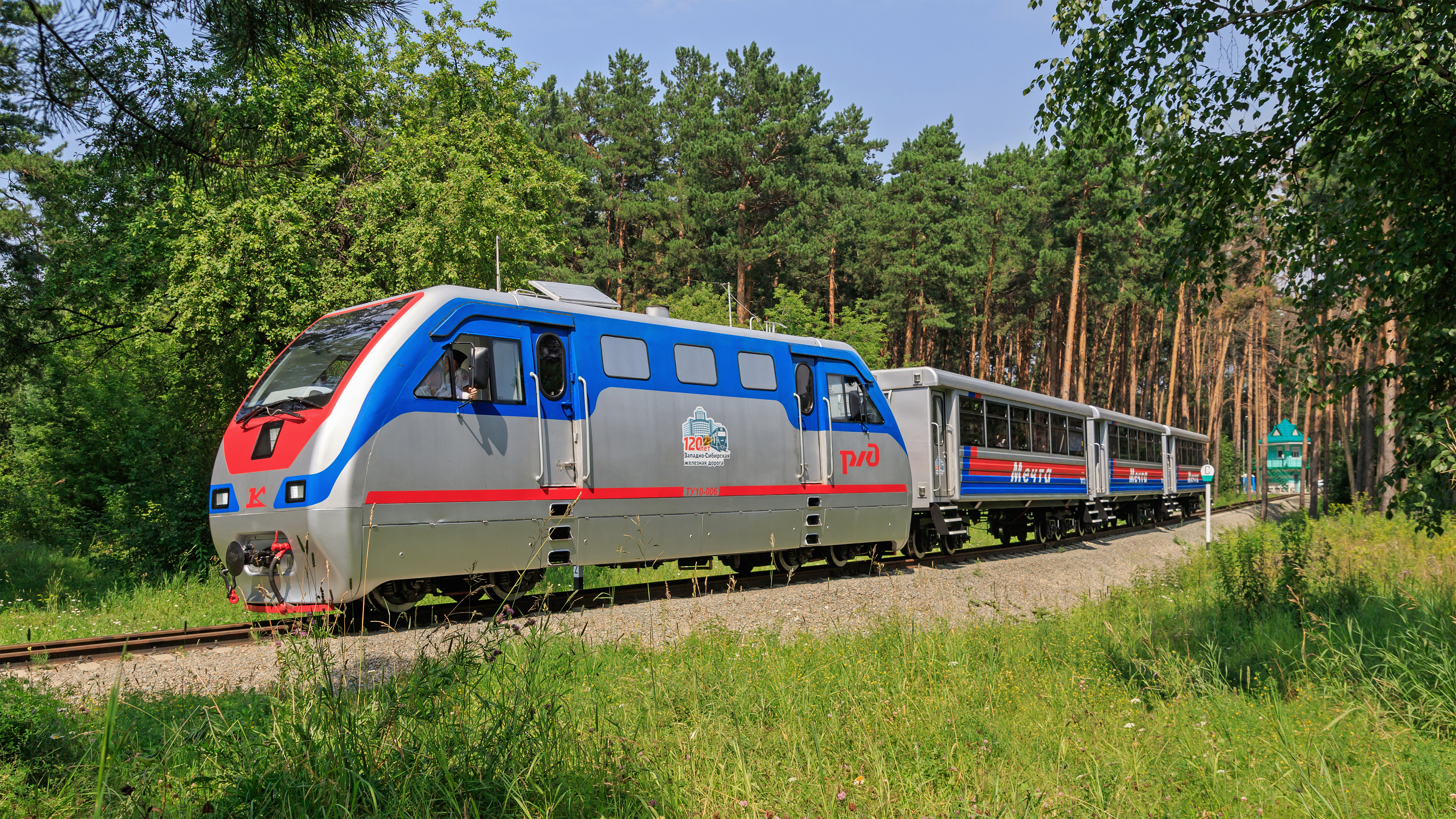
Small diesel locomotive

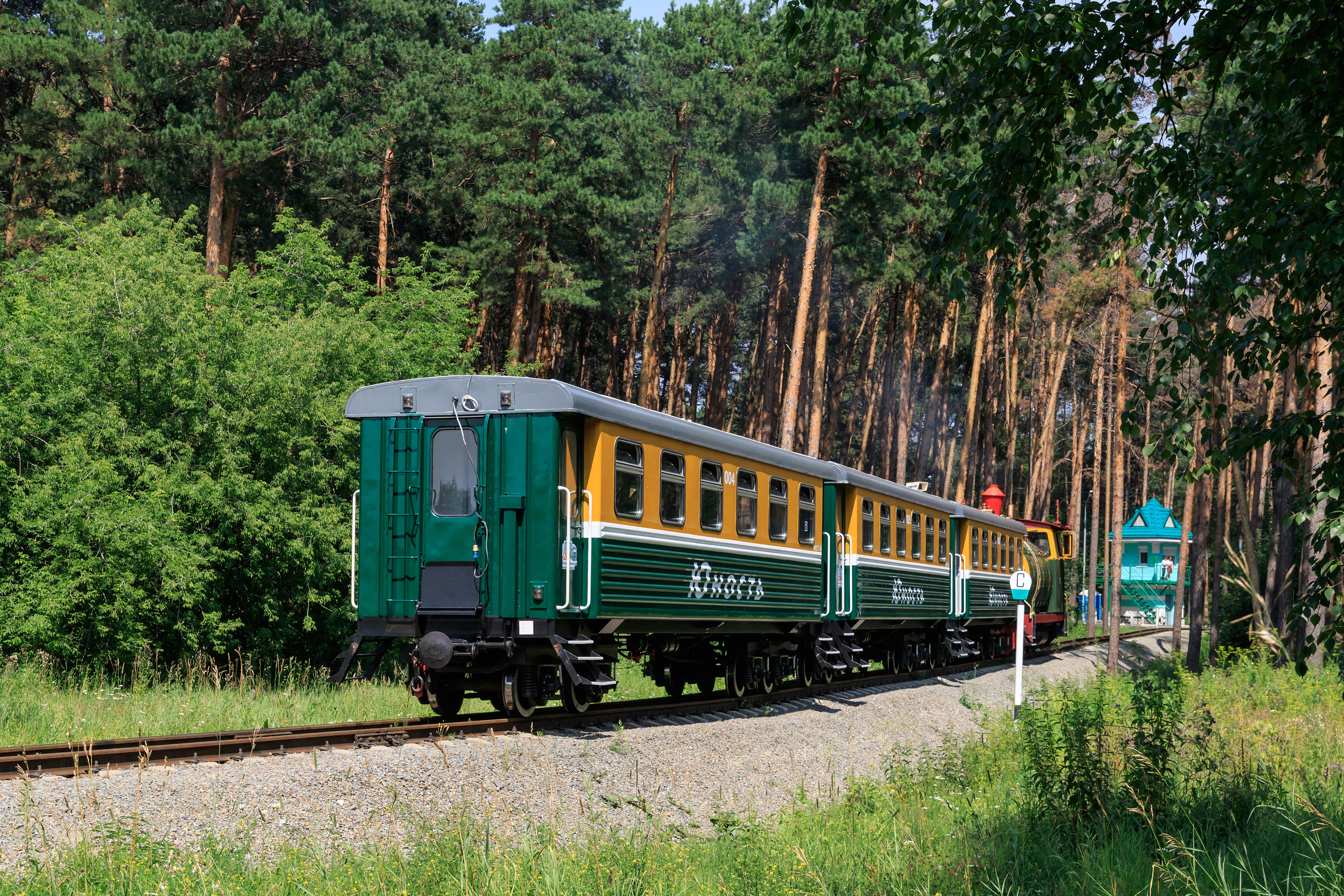
Passenger carriage

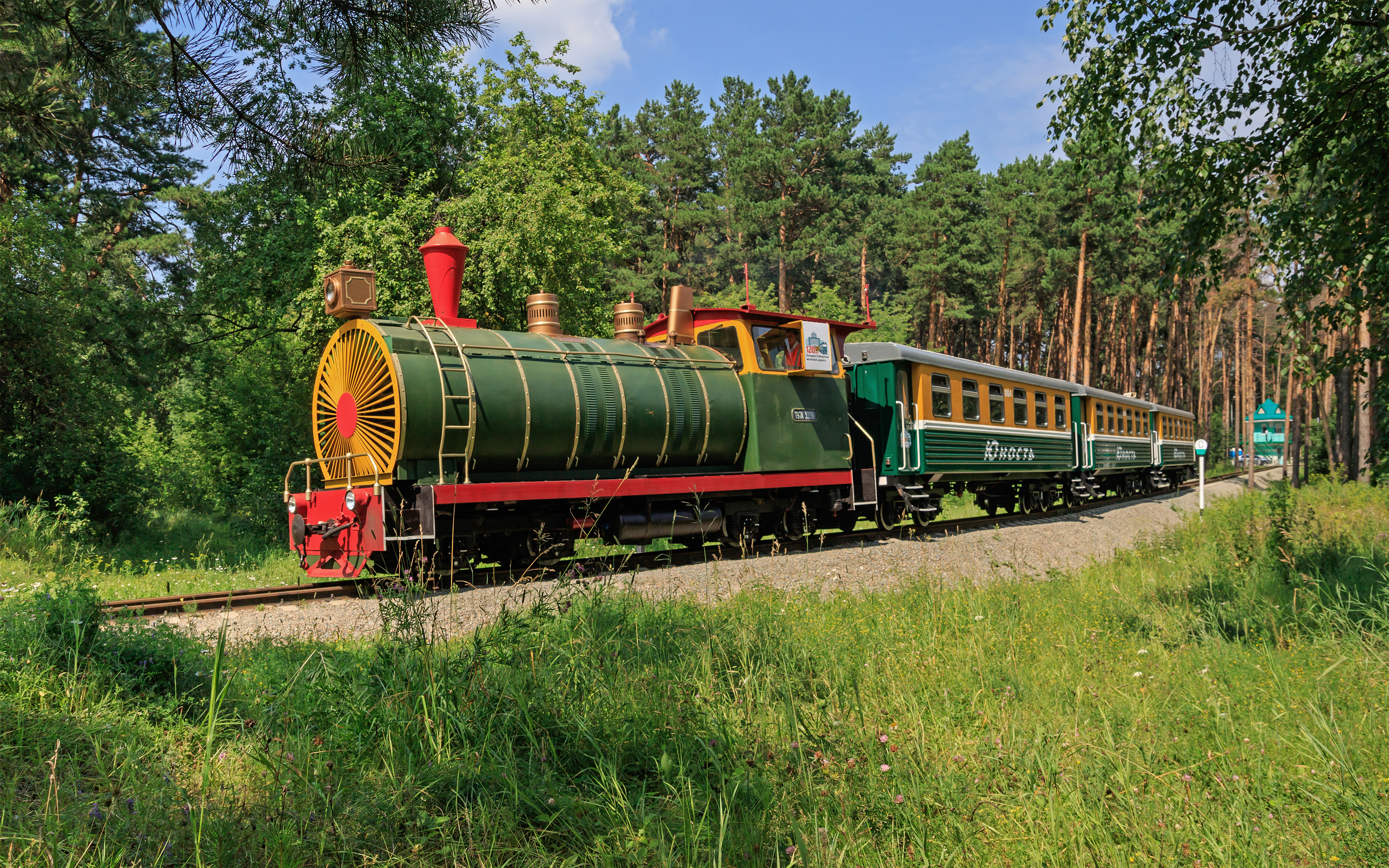
Modified diesel locomotive

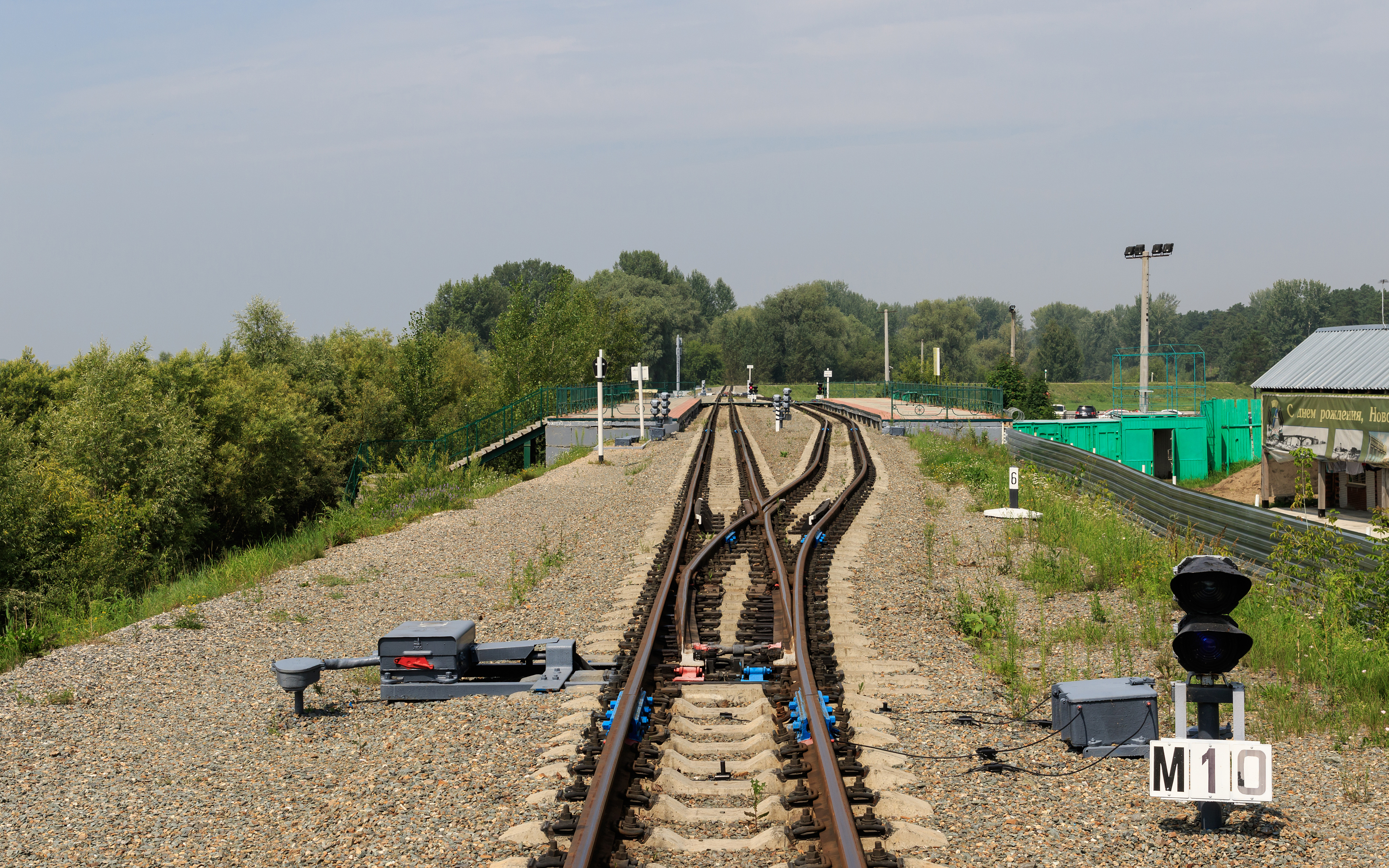
Track
