= Far East Children's Railway =

Coordinates: 48.507528°N 135.101495°E

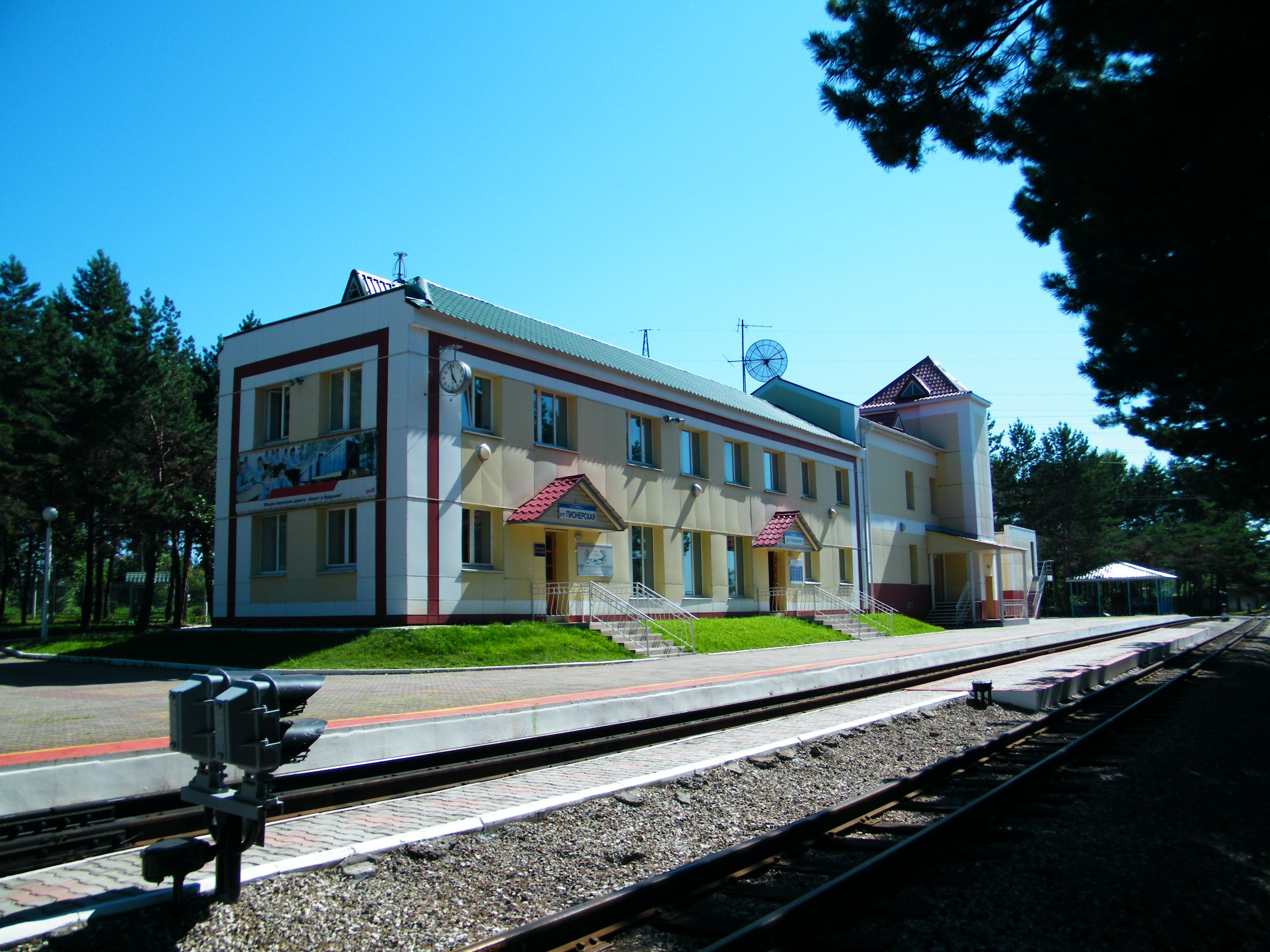
- Pionerskaya railway station, 2012 Route of the Far East Children Railway

Technical
- Line length: 2.5 kilometres (1.6 mi)
- Track gauge: 750 mm (2 ft 5 1/2 in)

The Far East Children's Railway (Russian: Дальневосточная детская железная дорога, Dalnevostochnaya detskaya zheleznaya doroga) is a narrow gauge miniature railway in the Russian city of Khabarovsk. The railway was opened on 19 May, 1958, as one of many pioneer railways in the USSR and is still in use.

== History ==
The railway was built by volunteers, after it had been initiated by Komsomol and the public. It was inaugurated on 19 May, 1958.

Initially, a circular loop with a length of 600 metres (0.37 mi) surrounded the park of a Sovkhoz. The passengers were transported by a railbus and four open wooden body carriages with 15 seats each. The rails were of Type P-18.

The railbus was replaced by a steam locomotive Type 159 with serial number 6421 in 1959. It is displayed on a plinth at the Pionerskaja railway station. Also in 1959, the track was extended along Karl Marx Street by heavier 3A rails up to a length of 3.3 kilometres (2.1 mi). In 1965, four Polish metal passenger cars with 38 seats each were delivered by Pafawag.

The Pionerskaya railway station was built in 1967, approximately 600 m from the main track. The steam locomotive was replaced in 1968 by a TU2 diesel locomotive. The station building was built in 1972. On the ground floor it houses offices, a workshop, a waiting room and a classroom equipped with visual aids.

A maintenance depot with a pit was built in 1979.The Pafawag carriages were replaced in 1986 by carriages of type PV51 by the Russian Demikhovo Machinebuilding Plant, and from 1987 more modern TU7 diesel locomotives were used.

In 1999, the children's railway was reconstructed. The first refurbishment phase was completed on 25 May 2000. A repair and training building was erected near the Pionerskaja railway station, the 3A rails were replaced by heavier R-50 rails and signal and communications systems were upgraded.

== Rolling stock ==
=== Locomotives ===
The following diesel locomotives are currently being used:

- TU7 diesel locomotives – № 2611 and 2612
- TU10 diesel locomotive – № TU10-017

=== Carriages ===
Three passenger carriages VP750, six metal-framed passenger carriages PV51 and four flatbed goods waggons are operational.

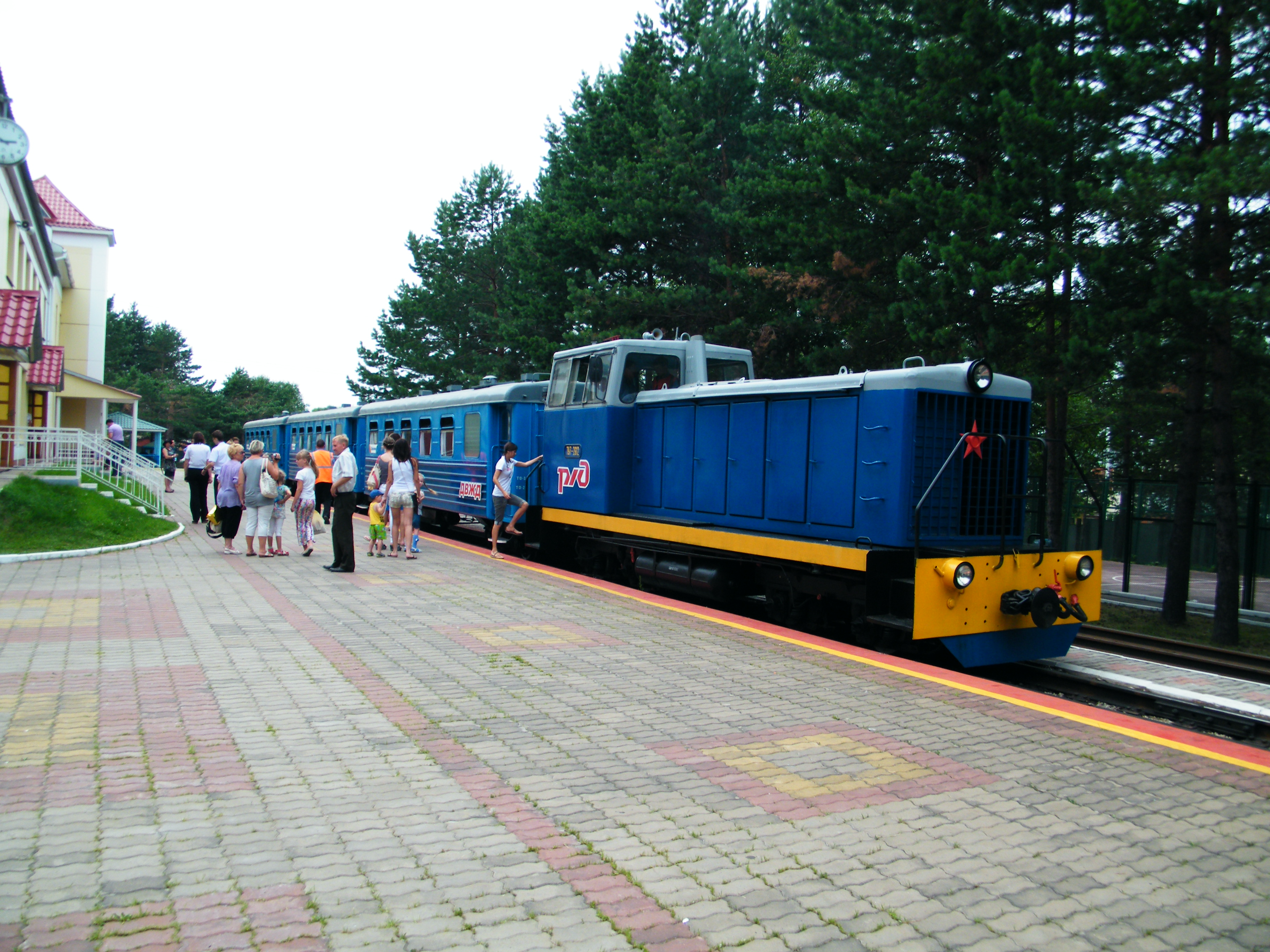
Diesel locomotive ТУ7, 2012

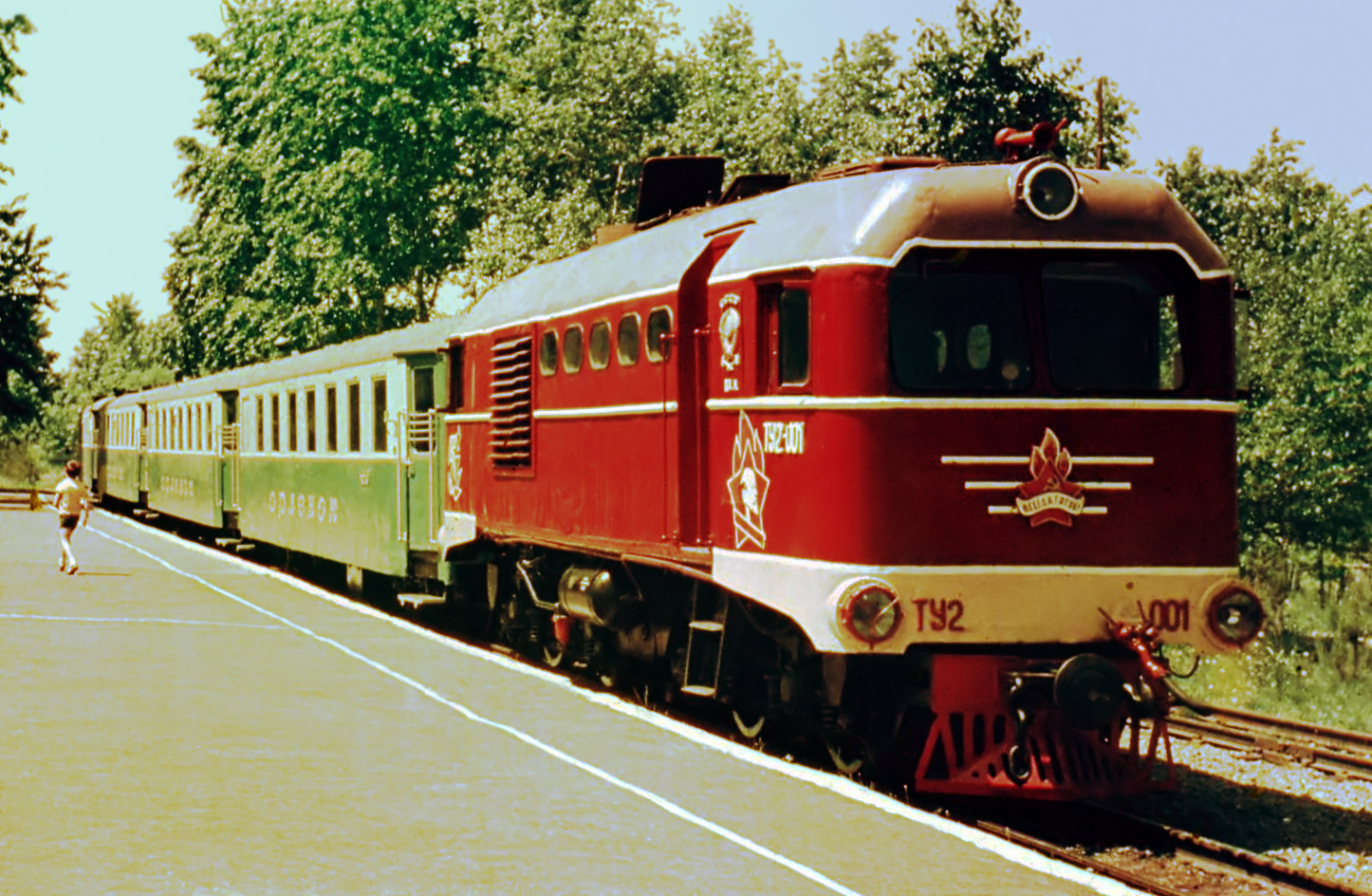
Diesel locomotive ТУ2, 1983

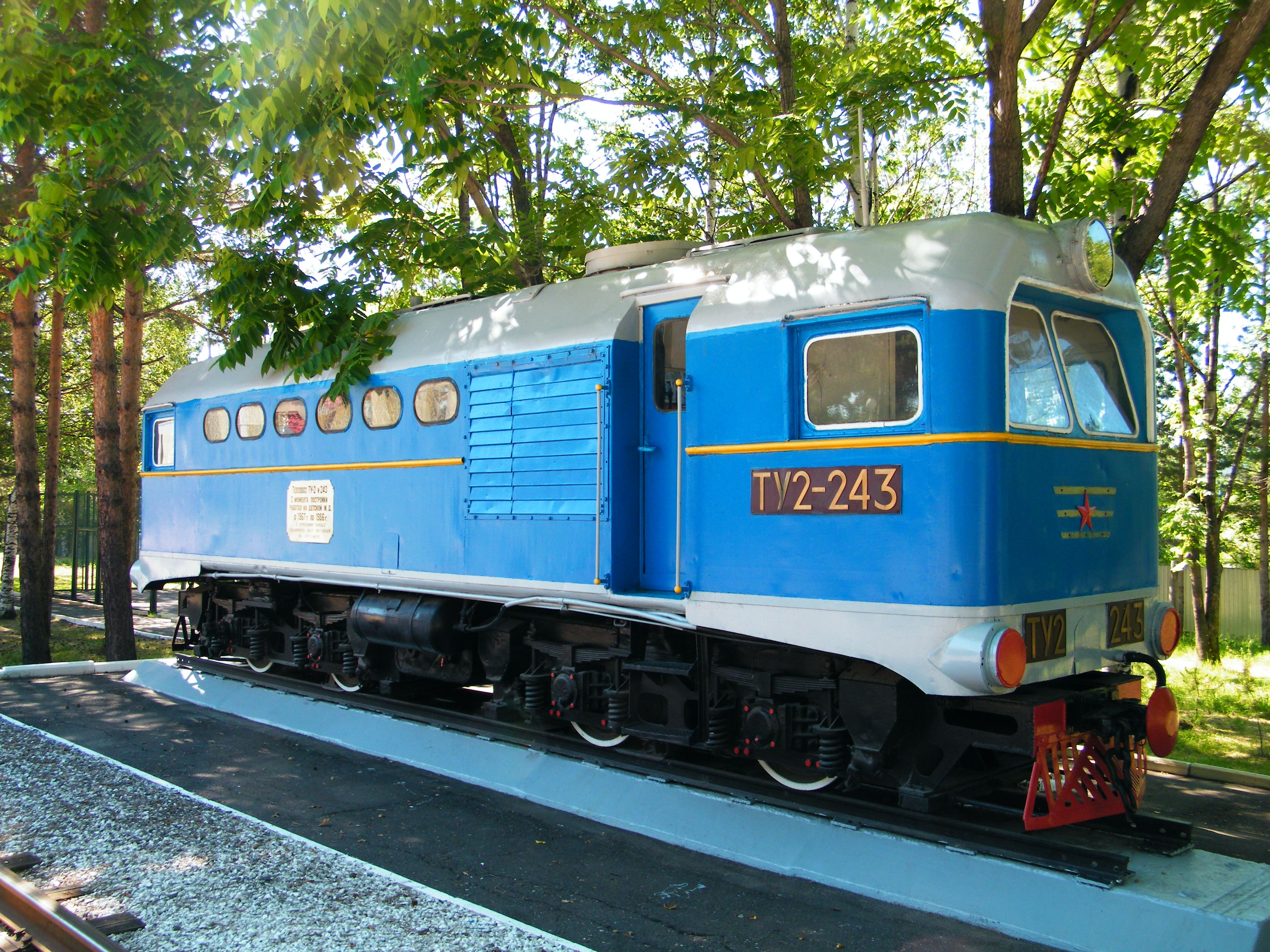
Plinthed diesel locomotive ТУ2, 2012

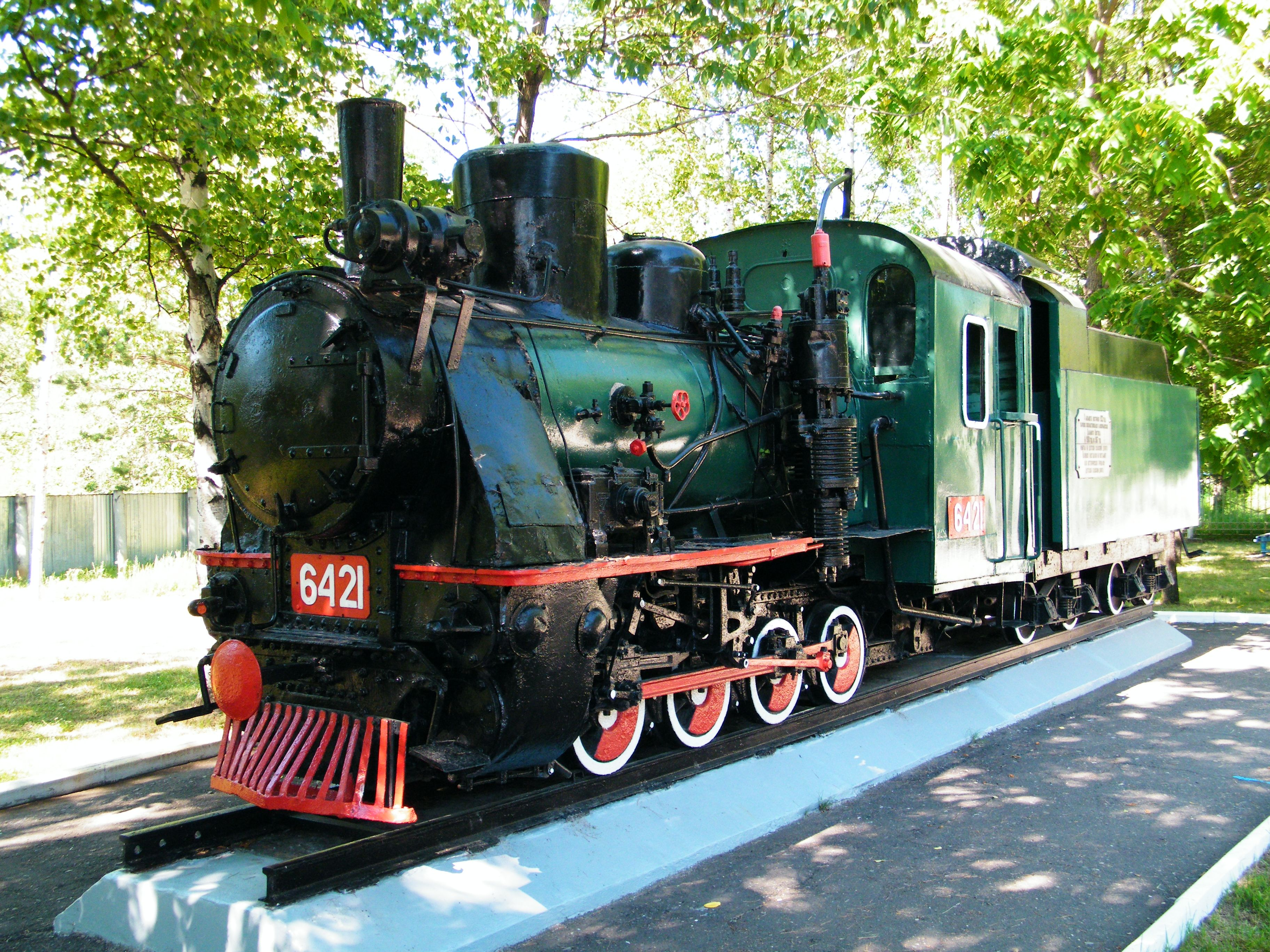
Steam locomotive 159-6421.

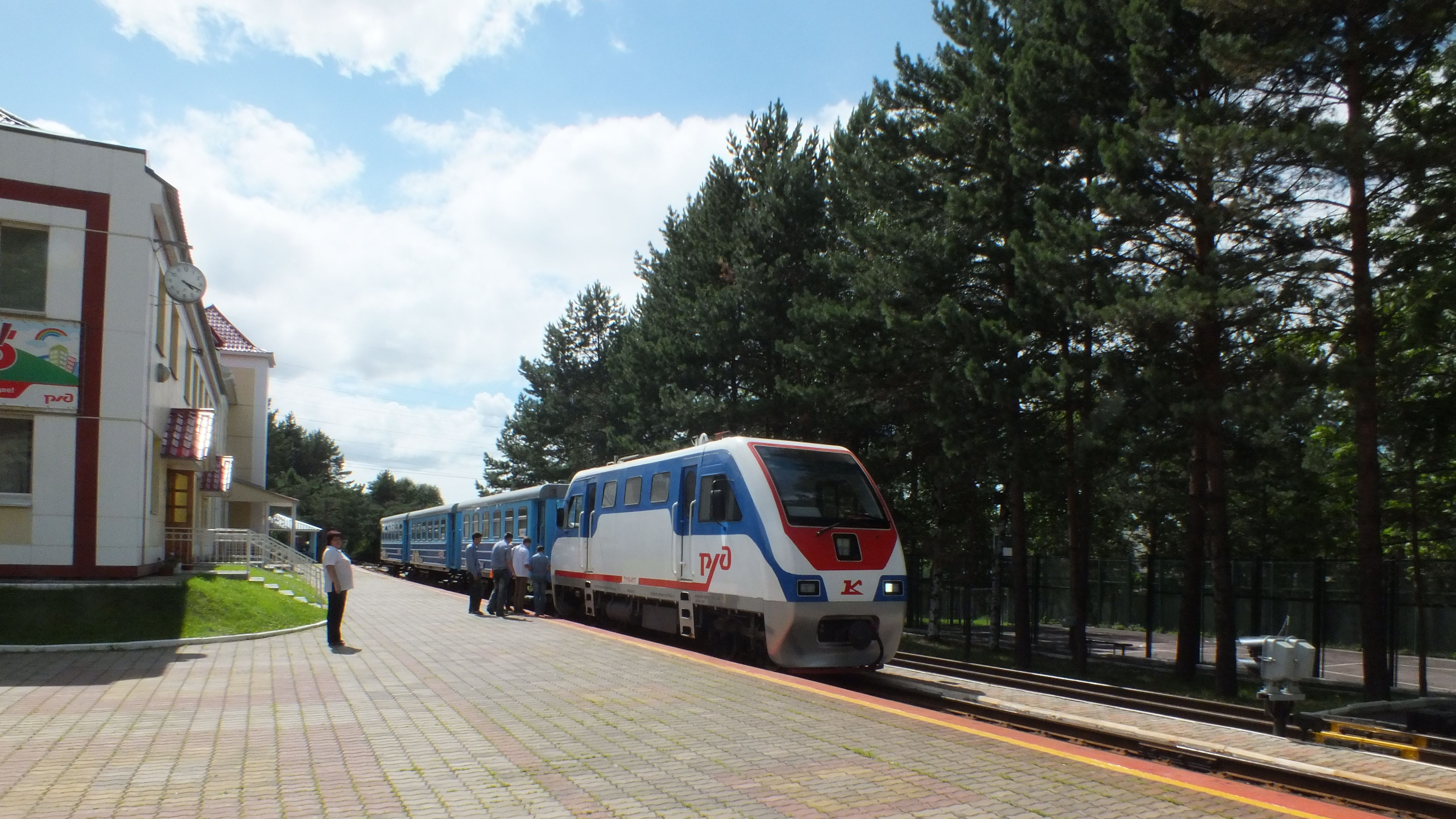
Diesel locomotive ТУ10, 2013.
