= Children's Railway (Efteling) =

Pedal train attraction

Coordinates: 51.6498°N 5.0533°E

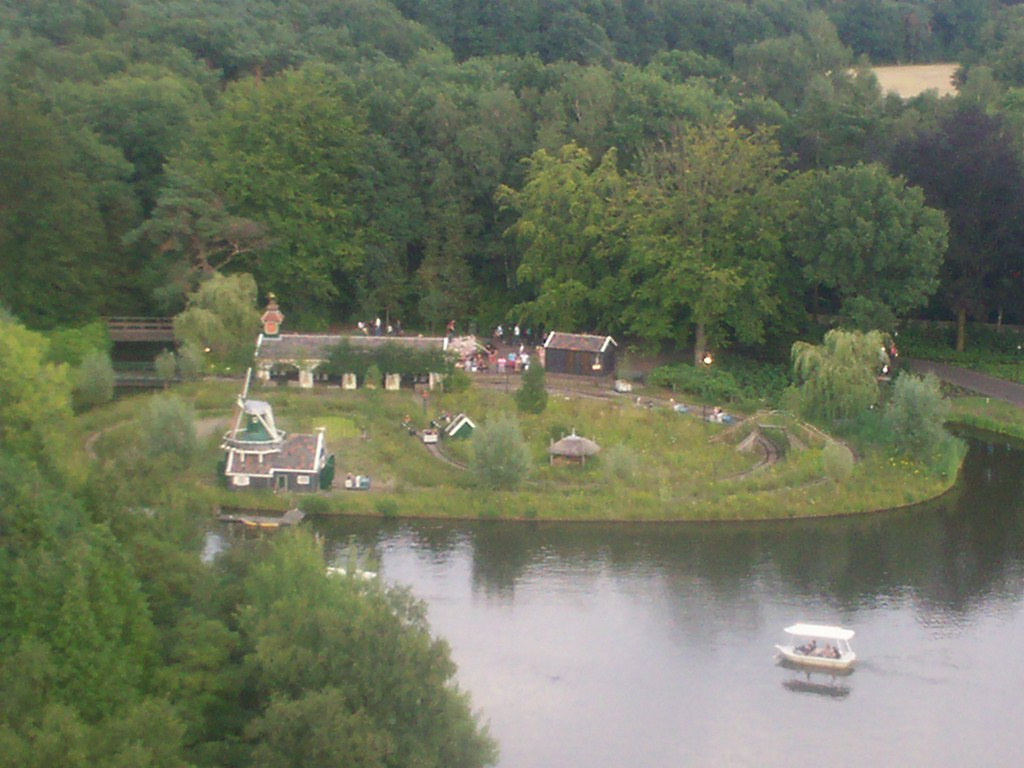
View upon the ride from Pagode

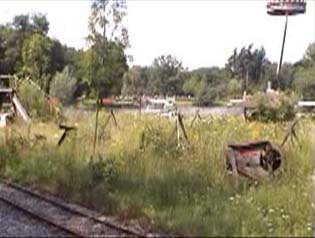
View from the other end

The Children’s Railway is a pedal train attraction in the Efteling amusement park.

== History ==
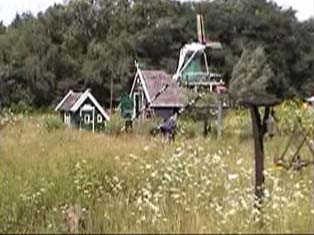
The level crossing open...

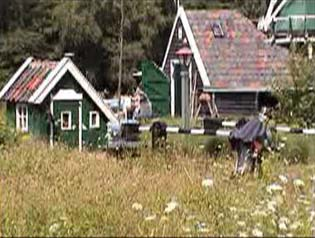
...and closed as a train approaches

The track was introduced in 1954 under the name Pedal Trains (Dutch: Traptreintjes) in the northern section of the park. The concept was developed by Peter Reijnders, who wanted to create a world where children could ride through, including a farm with corn fields, a pond, the railway station The Blue Heron (Dutch: de Blauwe Reiger) and a level crossing. The guard at this crossing is modeled after Reijnders. The original braking system in the station caused quite some accidents as it was quite abrupt.

In 2000 the ride was moved to the eastern side of the ornamental pond and renamed Children Railway (Dutch: Kinderspoor)

In the past, there was a small cross-country skiing track in the winter.

== Ride details ==
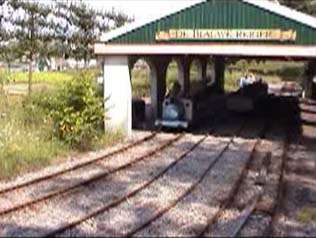
Station Blue Heron

- Ride length: 2 minutes
- Ride capacity: 750 passengers/ hour
- The trains are named after bird species
- During Winter Efteling the Children’s Railway is transformed into the langlauf track the Panting Deer (Dutch: 't Hijgend Hert).

== See also ==
- Children's Railway (disambiguation)
