= Children's Railway =

Children's Railway may refer to:

In general

- Children's railway - educational railways run by children
- Train ride - small trains suited for children

Specific railways

- Children's Railway (Efteling)
- Children's Railway (Budapest)
- Children's Railway Sakhalin
