= Zayeltsovsky Park =

Park in Novosibirsk, Russia

- Заельцовский парк
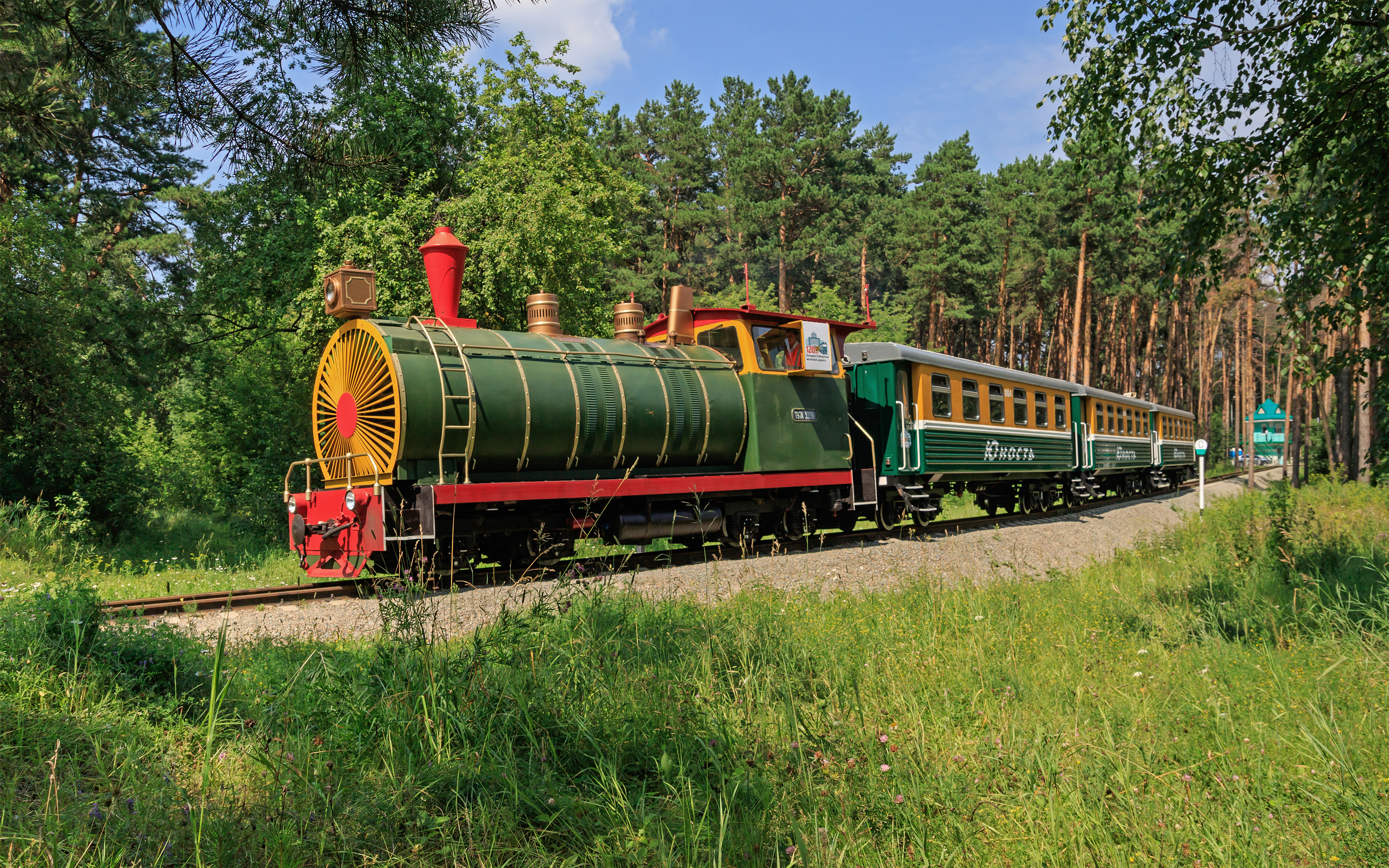
- Interactive map of Zayeltsovsky Park
- Location: Novosibirsk, Russia
- Coordinates: 55.05°N 82.85°E
- Open: 1932

Zayeltsovsky Park is a park in Zayeltsovsky District of Novosibirsk, Russia. It was created in 1932. The park is located in Zayeltsovsky Pine Forest.

== Location ==
It borders Ob River and Sukharka Microdistrict to the southwest.

== Description ==
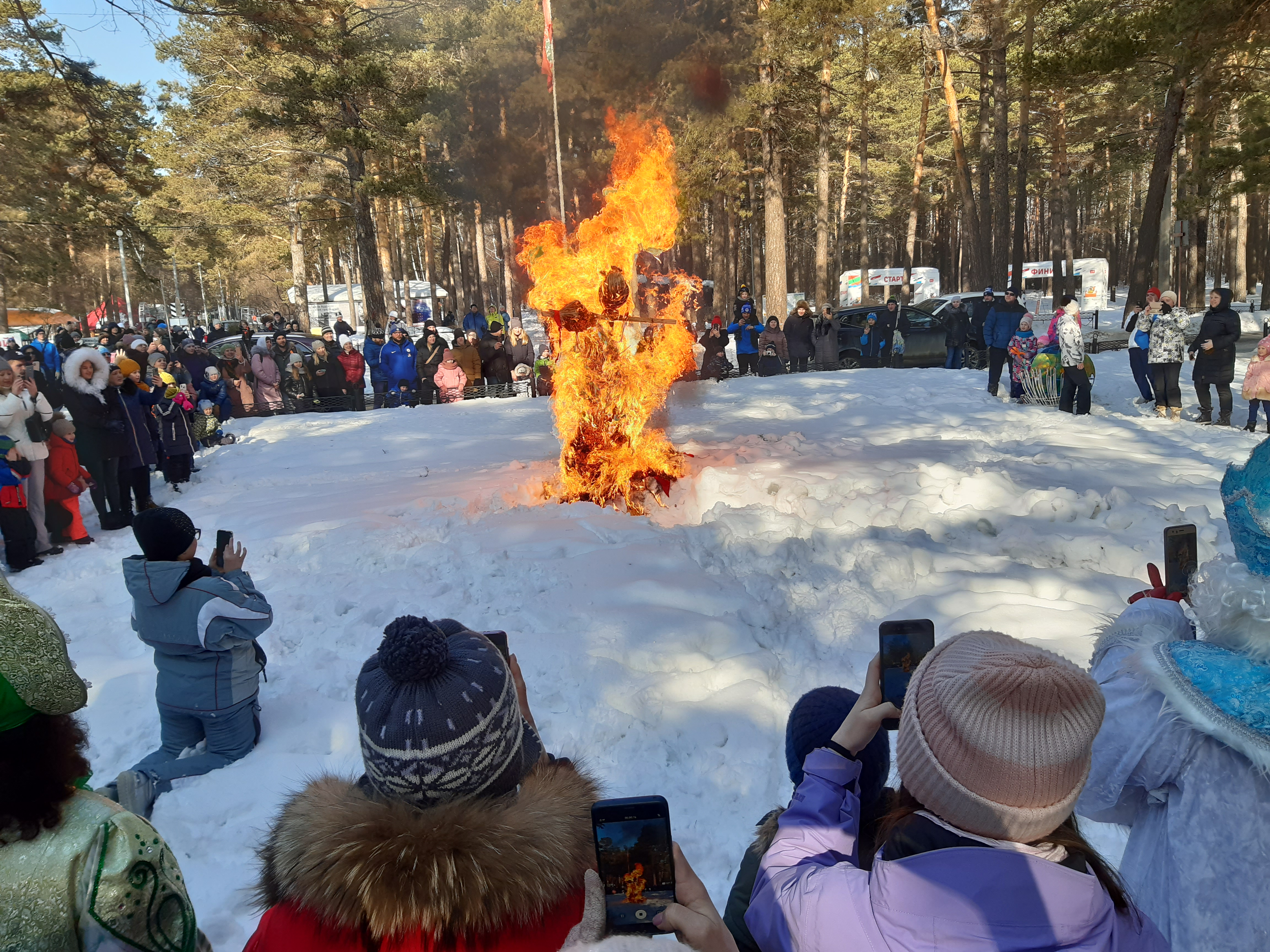
Maslenitsa in the park.

February 23, 2019, the final stage of the Complete Liberation of Leningrad from the Nazi Blockade was recreated.

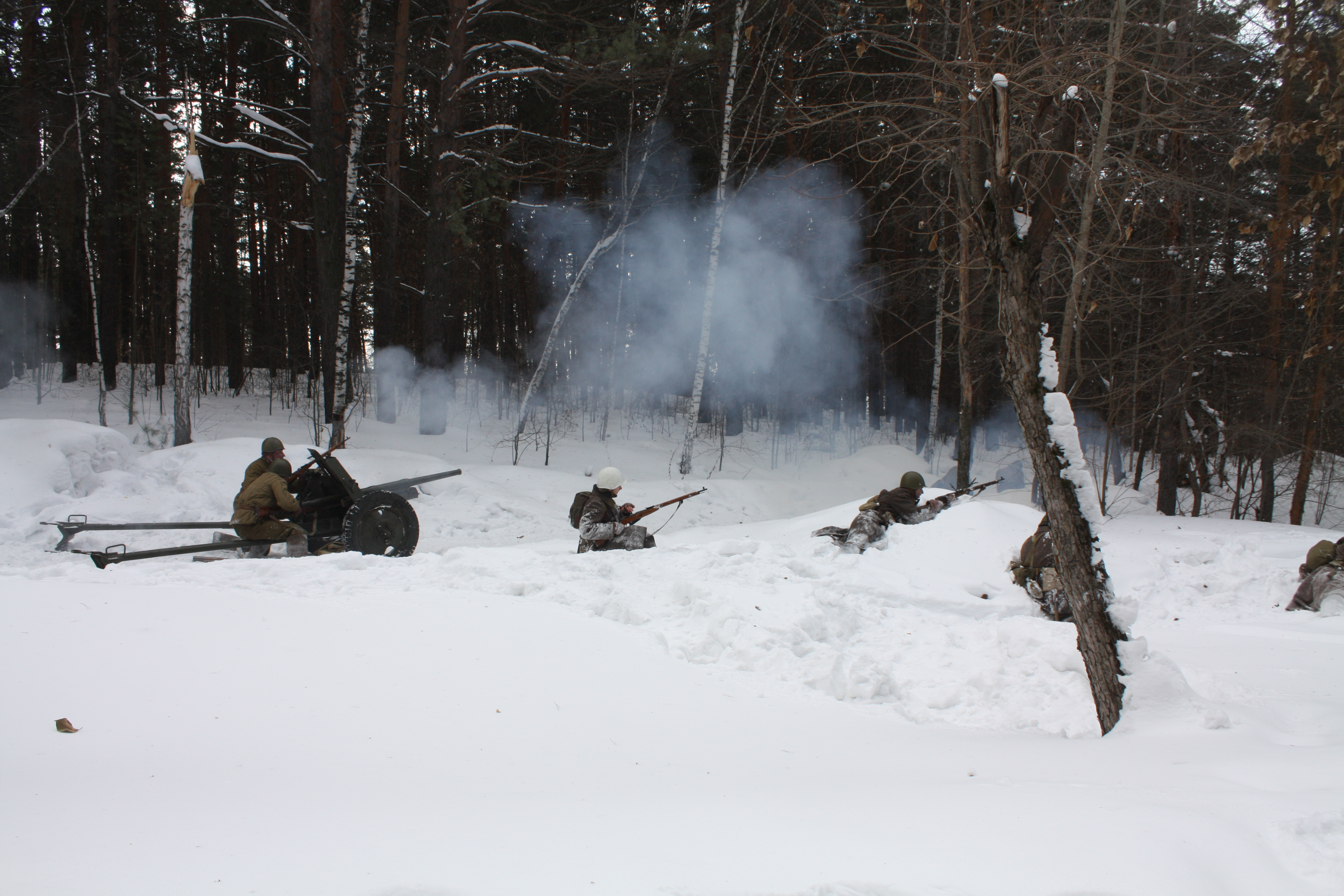
The reconstruction of the Great Patriotic War Events in 2017.

In August and September 2019, several festivals dedicated to the Middle Ages were also organized.

The Territory of Siberia is an ethnic park within the Zayeltsovsky Park. It is dedicated to the indigenous peoples of Siberia. It hosts exhibitions, concerts of throat singing, national holidays etc.

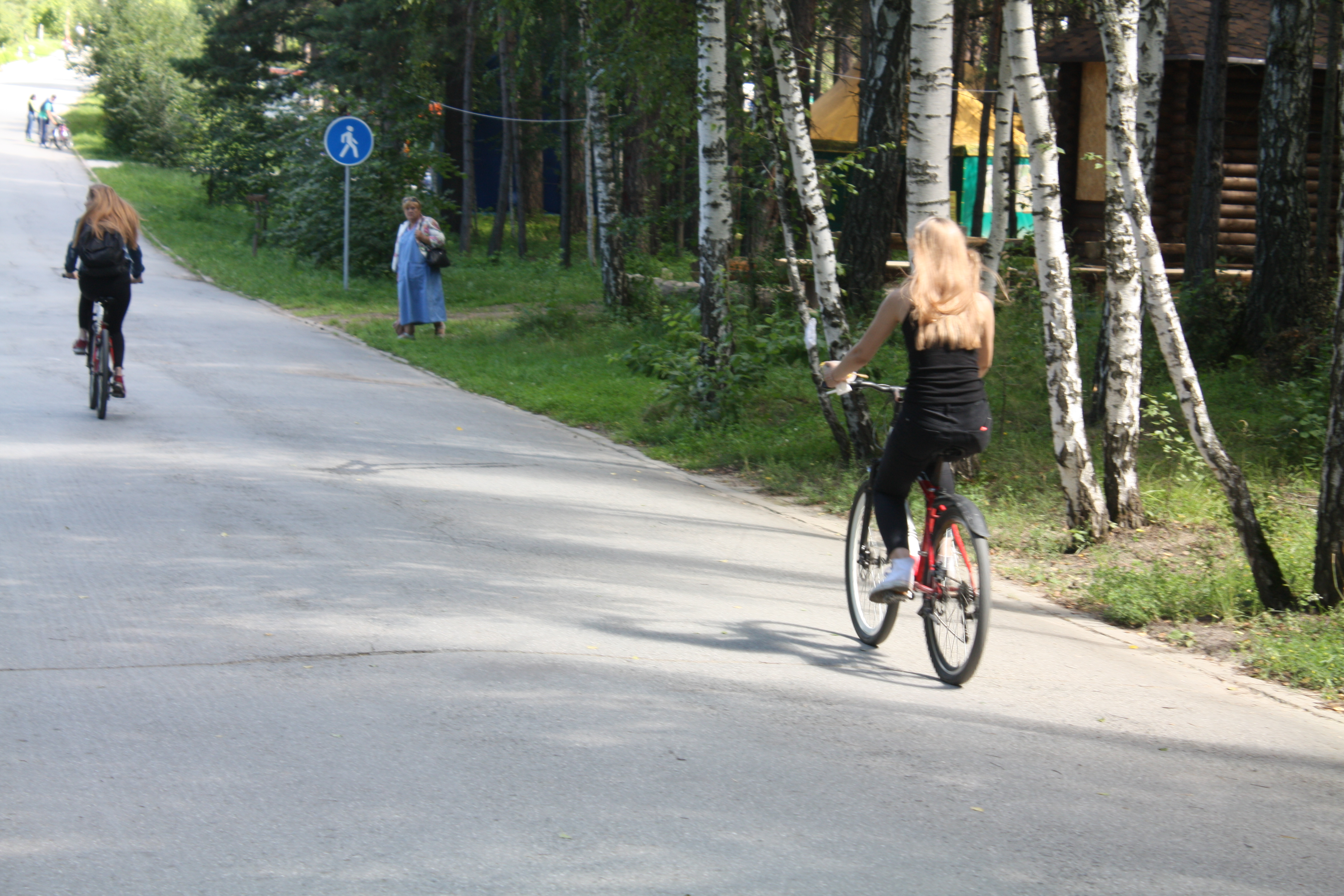

The Small West Siberian Railway runs through the park and connects it with the Novosibirsk Zoo.

== Gallery ==
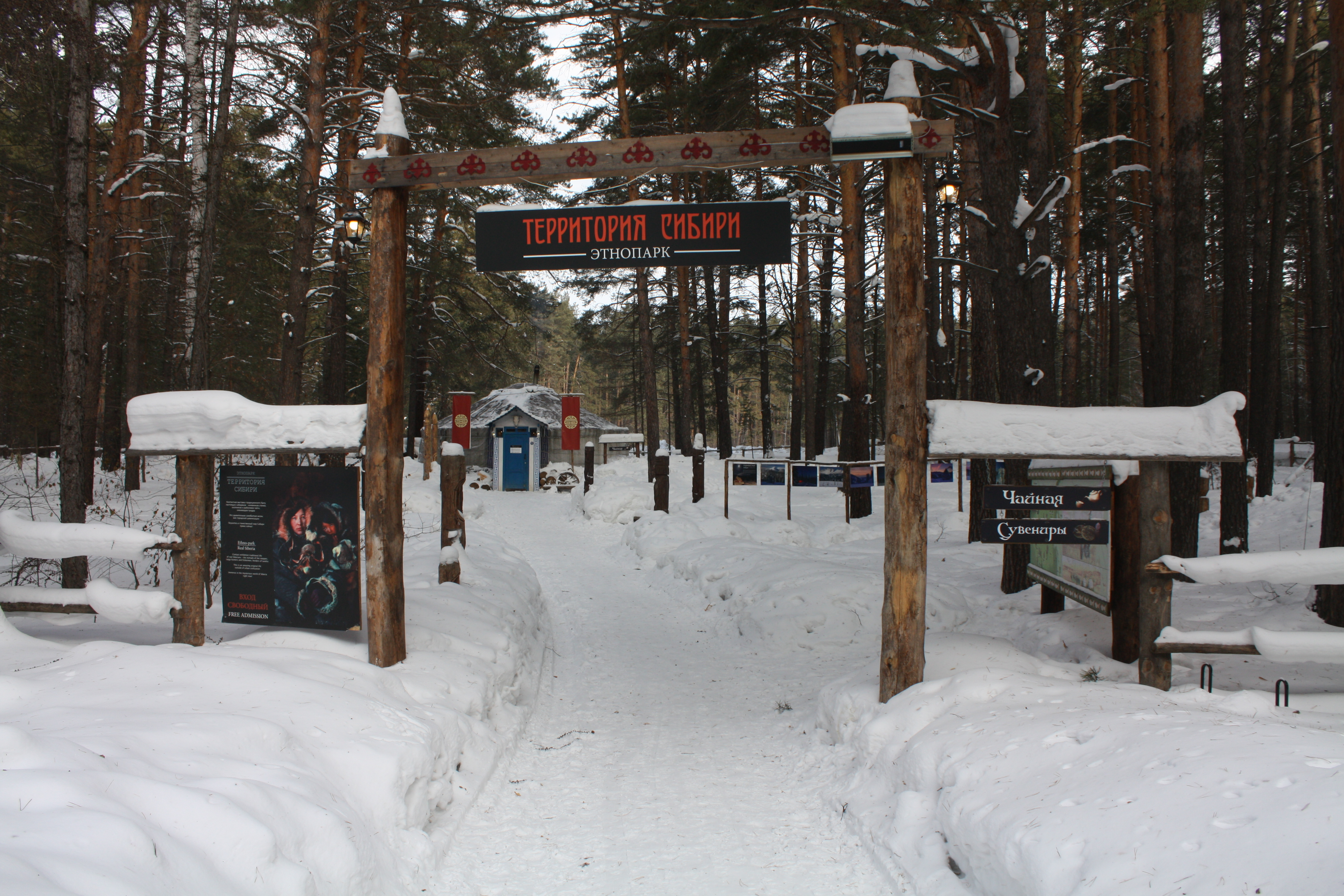

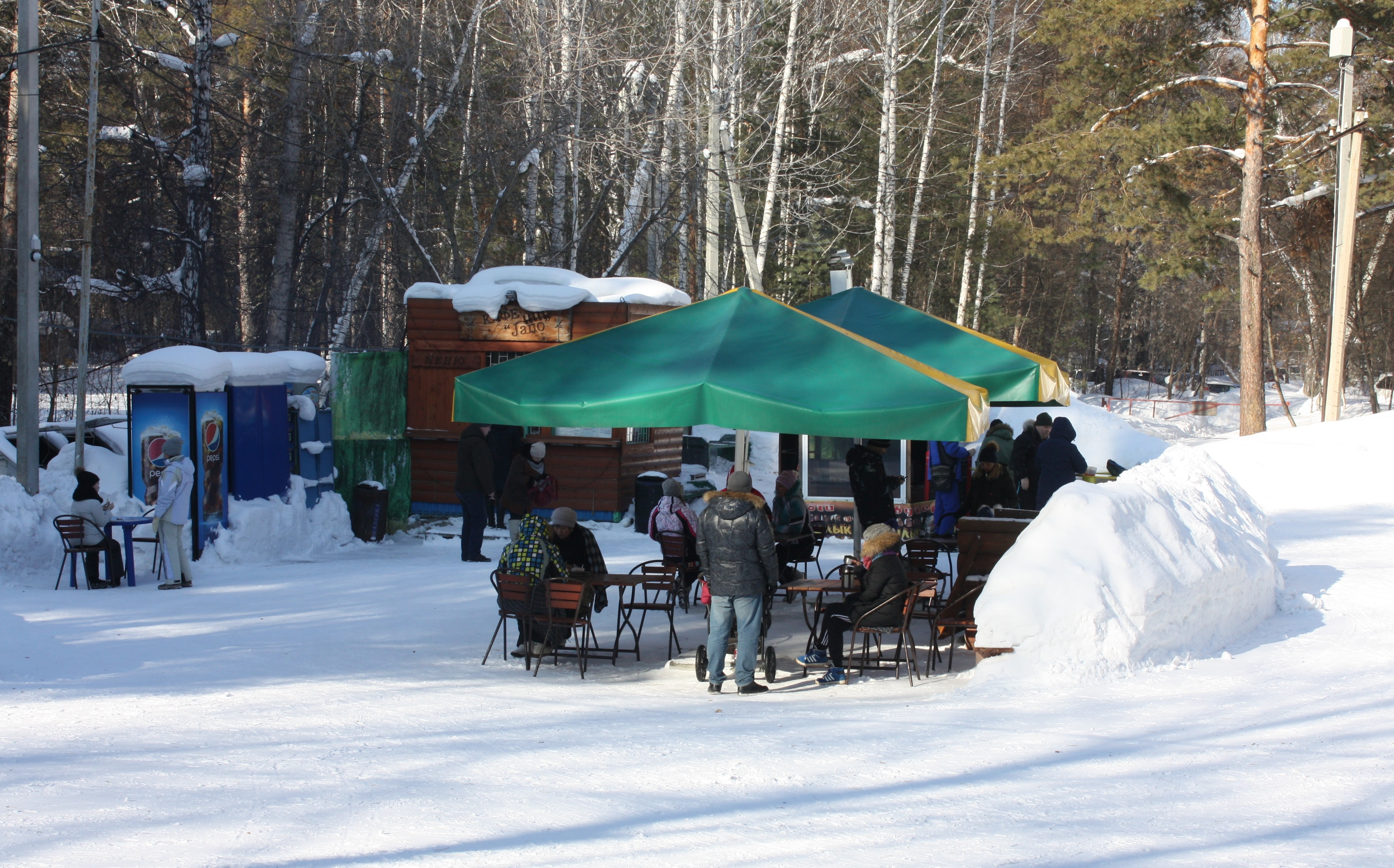

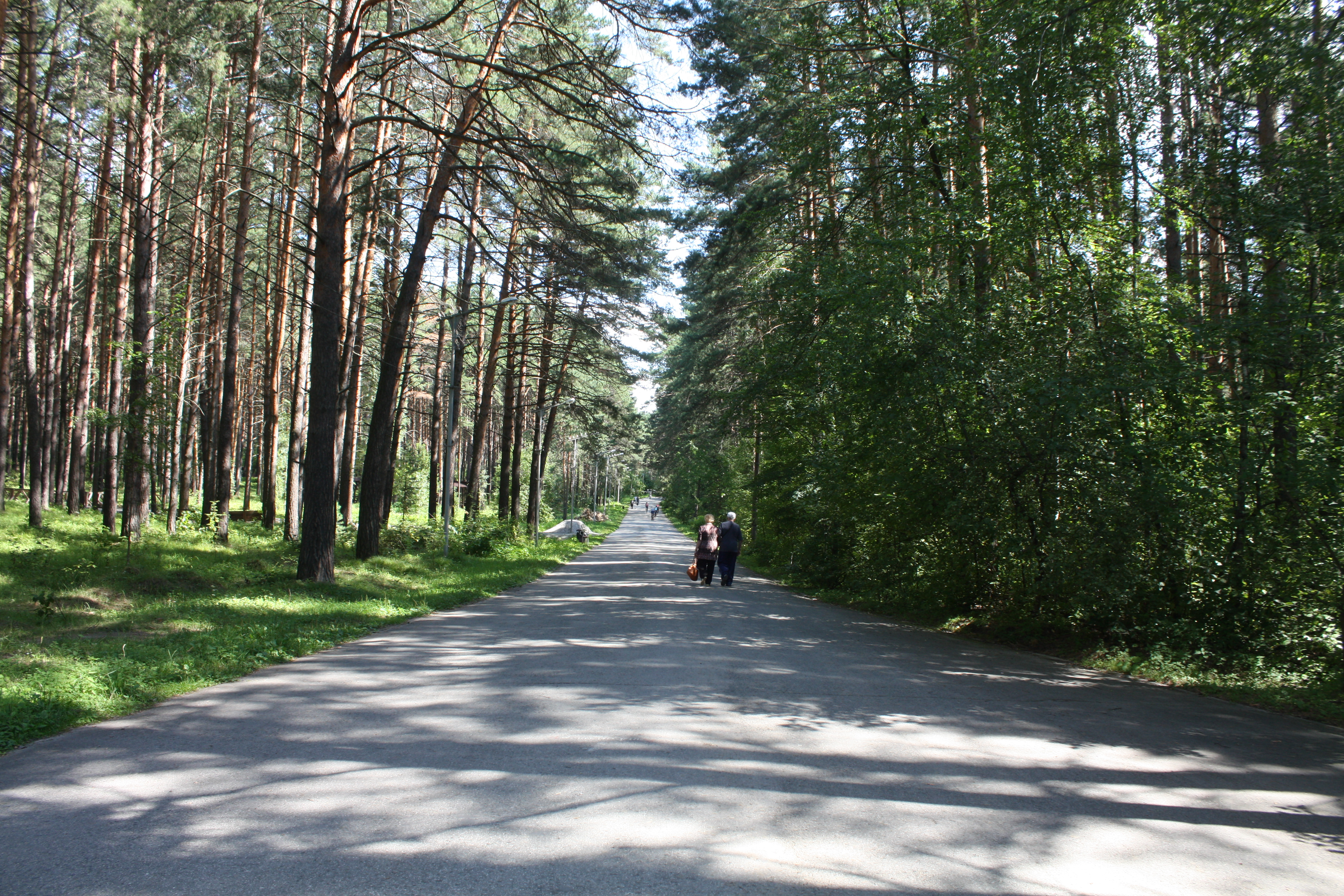

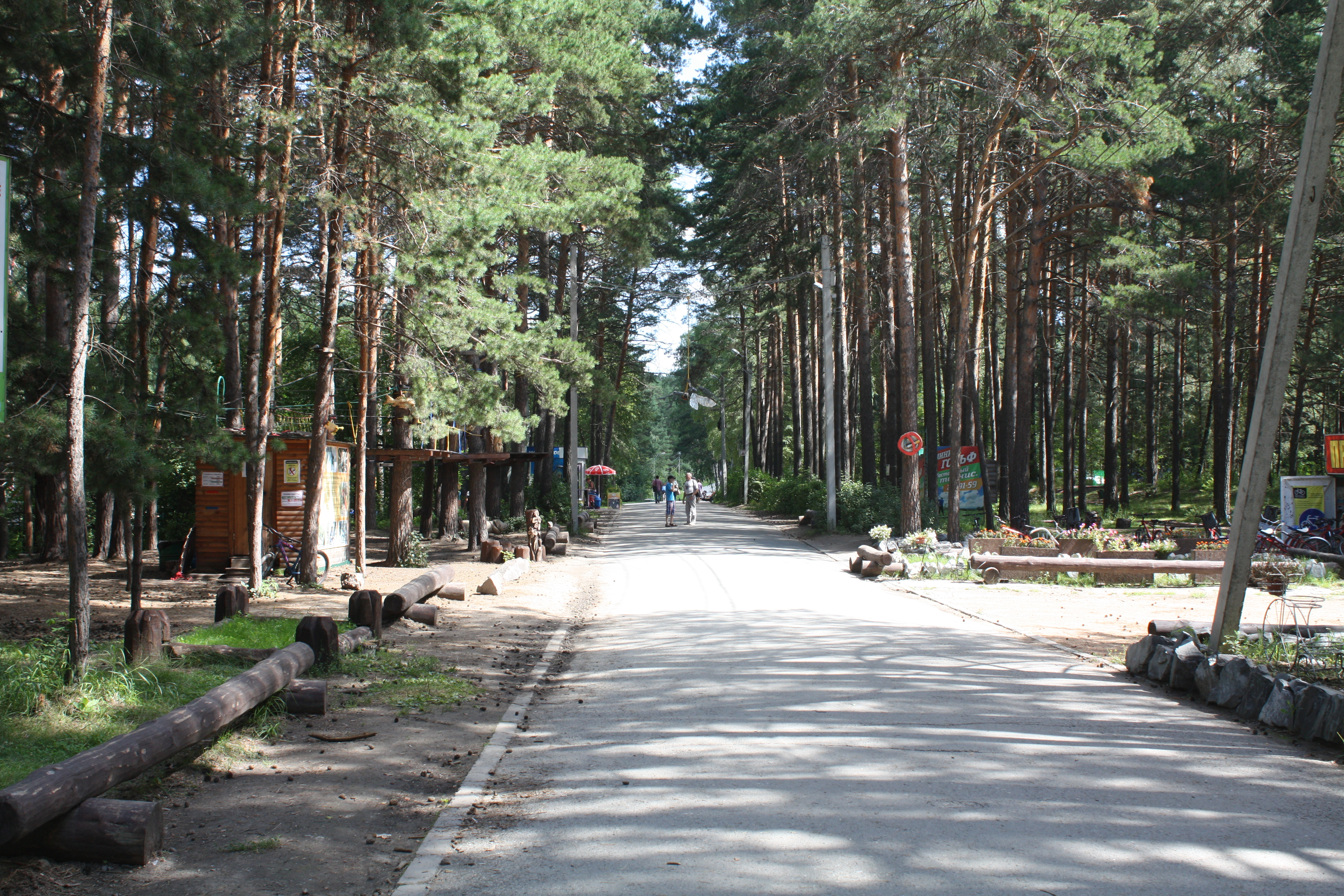

== Bibliography ==
- Ламин В. А. (2003). Энциклопедия. Новосибирск. Новосибирск: Новосибирское книжное издательство. p. 666. ISBN 5-7620-0968-8.
