= Yekaterinburg children railway =

Children's railway in Russia

Coordinates: 56°49′04″N 60°38′34″E

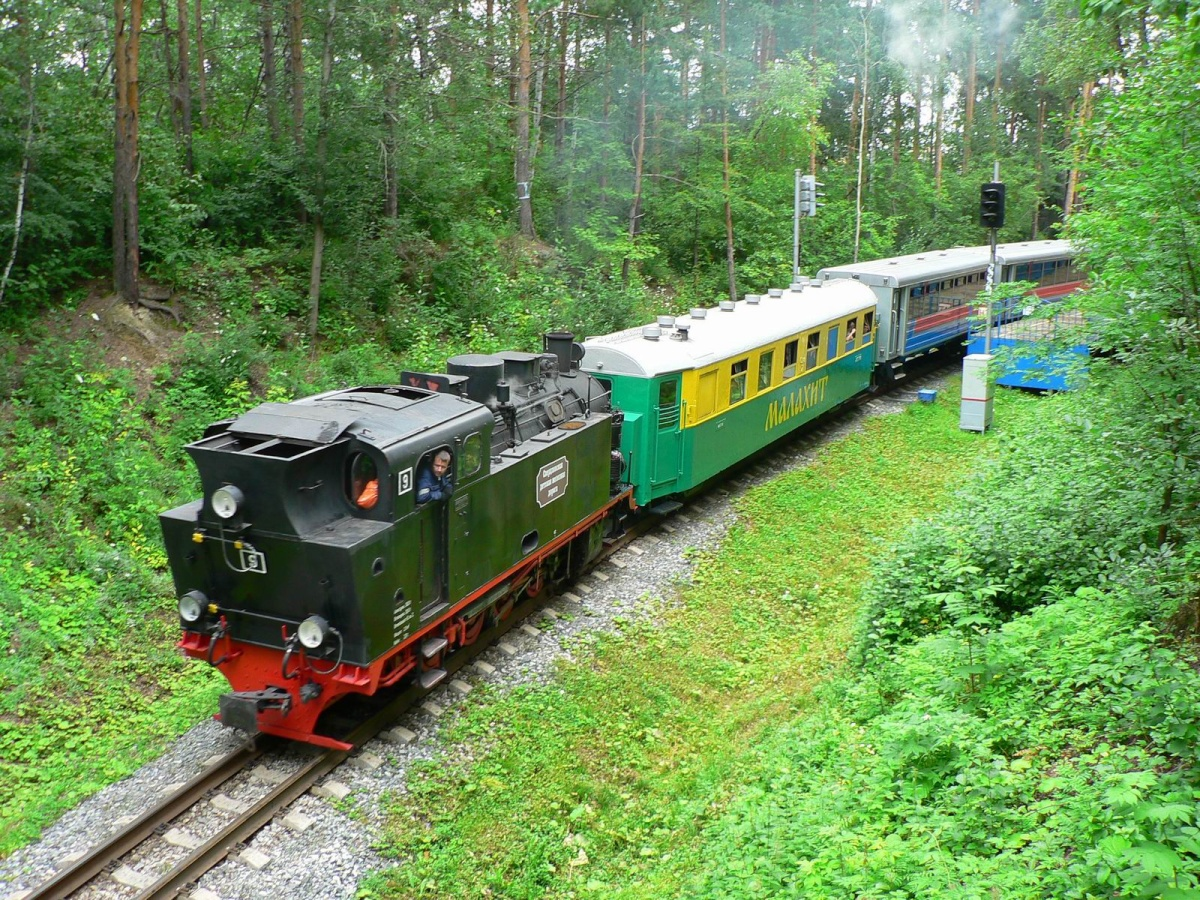
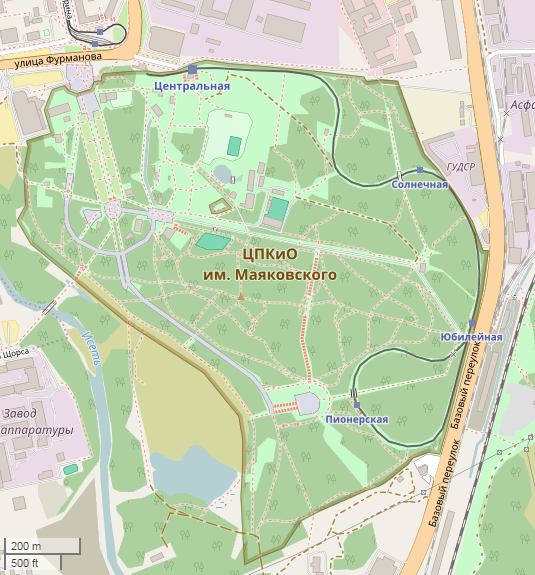
- O&K steam locomotive № 12350 (№ 9) with a passenger train on the track from Sun to Central Map

Technical
- Line length: 2.8 km (1.7 miles)
- Track gauge: 750 mm (29,5 inches)

Yekaterinburg children's railway (Russian: Малая Свердловская железная дорога имени Н. А. Островского; other names: MSZHD, DSZHD, Sverdlovsk children's railway, Ostrovsky Minor Sverdlovsk Railway) is a children's railway in the Mayakovsky Central Park of Entertainment and Culture in the city of Yekaterinburg, Russia. It was opened for passengers on 9 July 1960 as one of the many children's railways which were operated in the USSR. The railway currently operates Wednesdays to Sundays in the summer.

== History ==
After planning the construction of the children's railway in the late 1950s building of the children's railway, the Yekaterinburg (then called Sverdlovsk) city council and Komsomol of Yekaterinburg decided to establish their own children's railway. In the same year, construction began in the forest of the Central Park of Culture and Recreation named after Vladimir Mayakovsky. A committee of retired railway workers of the Sverdlovsky Railway, which was responsible for the training of youth railway workers, was convened. After the academic lessons in the railway workers' house, the youth received practical training on the children's railway.

== Route ==
The narrow-gauge route 750 millimetres (30 in) has four stations. The length is 2.8 kilometres (1.7 mi) and a round trip lasts 27 min. Although the train stops at all stations, passengers are only checked in at the final stations. The remaining stops are in the forest, and are rarely visited.

== Stations ==
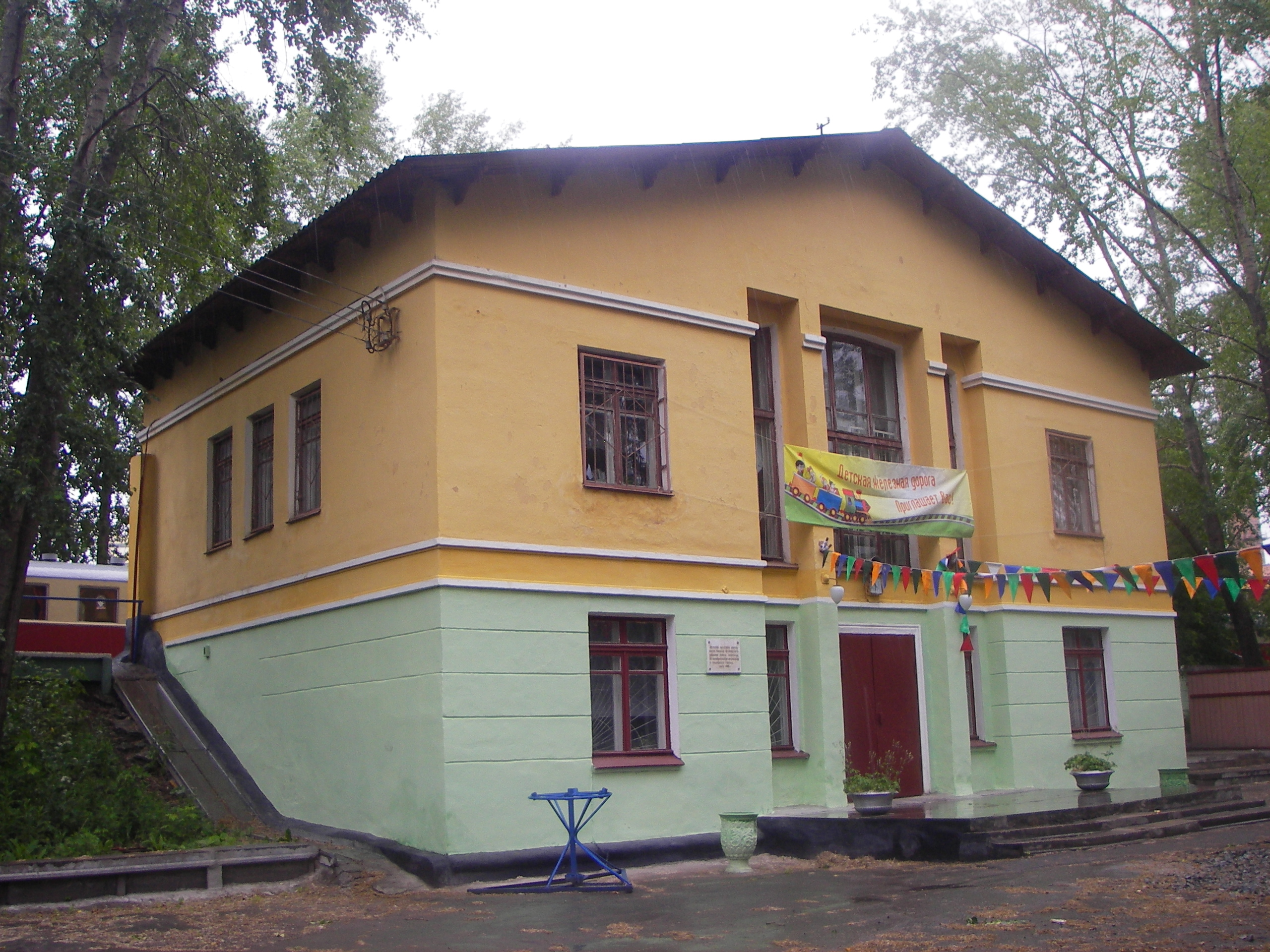
Central Station Building

The current main station is made of concrete and has two floors. On the ground floor, there is an office and waiting room for passengers. On the upper floor there is a hall and the offices of the manager and deputy manager of the children's railway and a ticket office. Behind the station there is a meeting point for young railway workers and a depot with additional rooms.

There are no rooms at Jubilee stop. This was previously a well-visited area of the park near the Central park station. There was a wooden ticket office on the platform which was not rebuilt after a fire. The person on duty at the Jubliee stop always travels on the station.

== Rolling stock ==
=== Locomotives ===
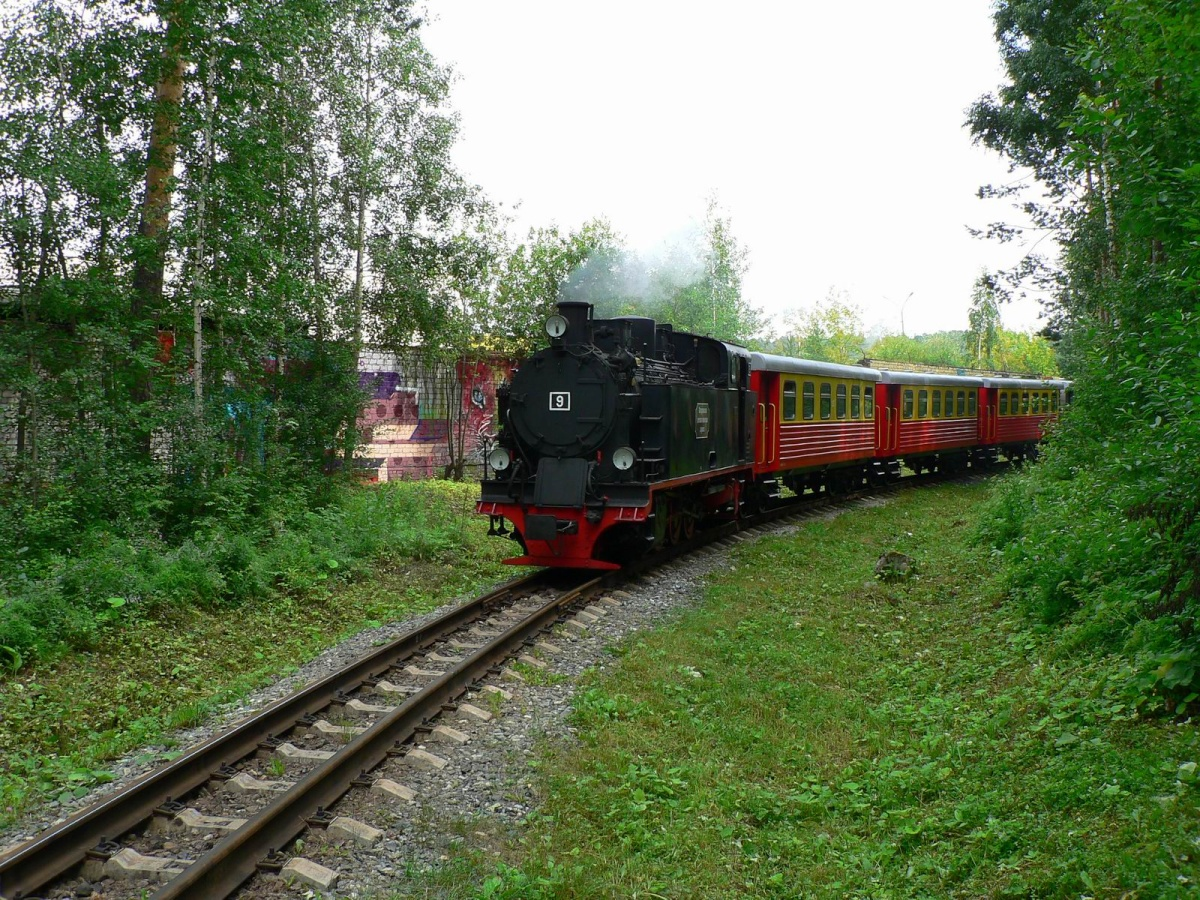
Steam Locomotive DH2T by Orenstein & Koppel

The Dh2t steam locomotive, which was built in Germany in 1931 by Orenstein & Koppel is occasionally used on public holidays. The railway also has the following diesel locomotives:

- Conversion diesel locomotives of the SŽD series ТУ7А – № 3355
- Diesel locomotive RŽD series ТУ10 – № TU10-013
- Diesel locomotive SŽD series ТУ2 – № 236

However, only two of the three diesel locomotives are currently in regular use: the narrow-gauge locomotive ТУ7А-3355 with an output of 294 kW (400 hp) and a weight of 24 tons and a smaller ТУ10-013 with an output of 170 kW (230 hp). The diesel locomotive ТУ2–236 came to the children's railway after the closure of the narrow-gauge railway in Tula Oblast (Тула-Лихвинская узкоколейная железная дорога) in 2000 Sverdlovsk. It is rarely used. There is also a PD-1 handcar which is only used for service purposes.

=== Passenger cars ===
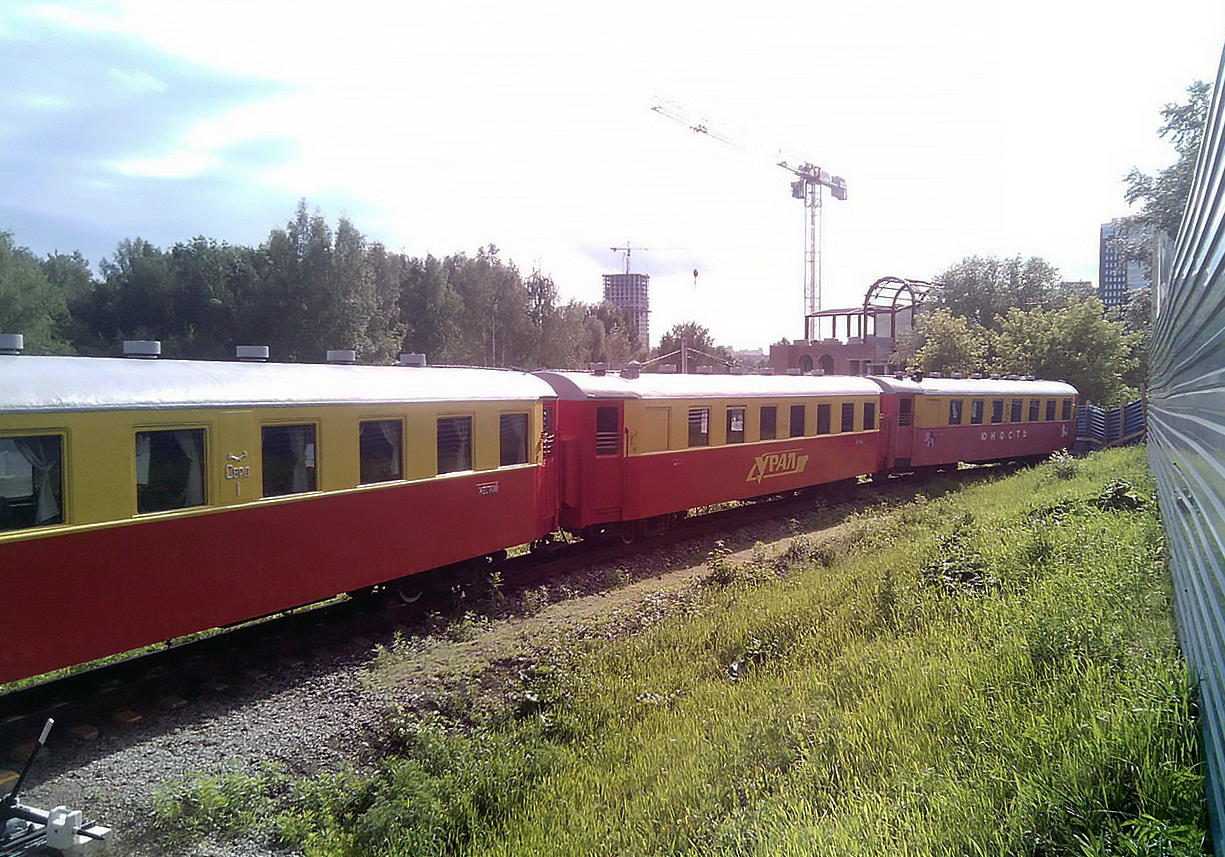
Pafawag Car Type VP750

Six VP750 cars from the Kambarka Engineering Works are used in regular passenger transport (as of June 2015). The wagons were purchased at different times: the first three wagons were delivered in 2010, before the restoration of the railway line was completed. They are painted red and yellow. The second batch, also consisting of three cars, was delivered in mid-2013. These cars have a slightly modified shape, especially in the windows, and are equipped with luggage racks and tables. The cars have not been repainted and still feature the original gray, red and blue colors. Trains typically have three cars during the week and six cars on weekends. There are several passenger wagons produced by Pafawag.
