= TU7 diesel locomotive =

Class of diesel locomotives

TU7 - TU7A
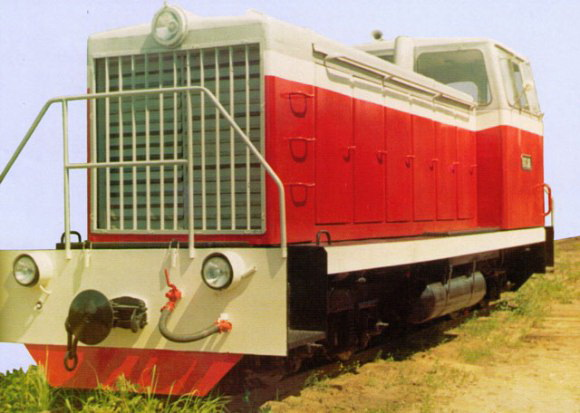
Type and origin
- Power type: Diesel
- Builder: Kambarka Engineering Works
- Build date: 1971 - today
Specifications
- Configuration
  - UIC: B'B'
- Gauge: 750 mm (2 ft 5 1/2 in) to 1,435 mm (4 ft 8 1/2 in)
- Wheel diameter: 600 mm (23.62 in)
- Minimum curve: 40 m (131.23 ft)
- Length: 9,400 mm (30 ft 10 1/8 in)
- Width: 2,450 mm (8 ft 1/2 in)
- Height: 3,550 mm (11 ft 7 3/4 in)
- Axle load: 5 t (4.9 long tons; 5.5 short tons) (?)
- Loco weight: 24 t (24 long tons; 26 short tons)
- Fuel type: Diesel
- Prime mover: Bernaul 1D12-400
- Engine type: V12 diesel
- Cylinders: 12
- Transmission: hydraulic
Performance figures
- Maximum speed: 50 km/h (31 mph)
- Power output: 400 hp
Career
- Class: RUS - ТУ7 / ТУ7А; Belarus - ТУ7 / ТУ7А; Bulgaria - TU7E (series 81 БДЖ); Slovakia - TU46; Vietnam - D4H / D4Hr; Ukraine - ТУ7 / ТУ7А; Estonia - ТУ7 / ТУ7А; Latvia - ТУ7 / ТУ7А; Lithuania - ТУ7 / ТУ7А; Cuba - TU7E; Guinea - TU7E

TU7 (ТУ7) - Soviet, later Russian diesel locomotive for gauge 750 mm (2 ft 5 1/2 in) – 1,067 mm (3 ft 6 in).

== History ==
The TU7 (ТУ7) was developed in 1971–1972 at the Kambarka Engineering Works to replace the aging locomotive classes TU4 (ТУ4) and TU2 (ТУ2). There were 3,361 locomotives constructed, of which several hundred were exported to the countries of the socialist community and affiliated countries. The TU7 - TU7A (ТУ7 - ТУ7А) was designed to be used on any gauge from 750 mm (2 ft 5 1/2 in) to 1,435 mm (4 ft 8 1/2 in). In 1986 the locomotive design was updated and designated type TU7A (ТУ7А).

== D4H ==
The D4H 1,000 mm (3 ft 3 3/8 in) and 9 locomotives D4Hr for standard gauge 1,435 mm (4 ft 8 1/2 in), also known as the TU7 - TU7A (ТУ7 - ТУ7А) diesel locomotive, is a series of diesel locomotives currently used on the Vietnamese railway network. With 77 1,000 mm (3 ft 3 3/8 in) D4H locomotives in service throughout the country as of 2005, it is the most common locomotive class used in Vietnam. The series was originally procured from the Soviet Union after the Vietnam War.

== Additional specifications ==
- Distance between bogies - 4,700 mm (185.04 in)
- Bogie wheelbase - 1,400 mm (55.12 in)
- Engine speed - 500 to 1,560 r/min

== Gallery ==
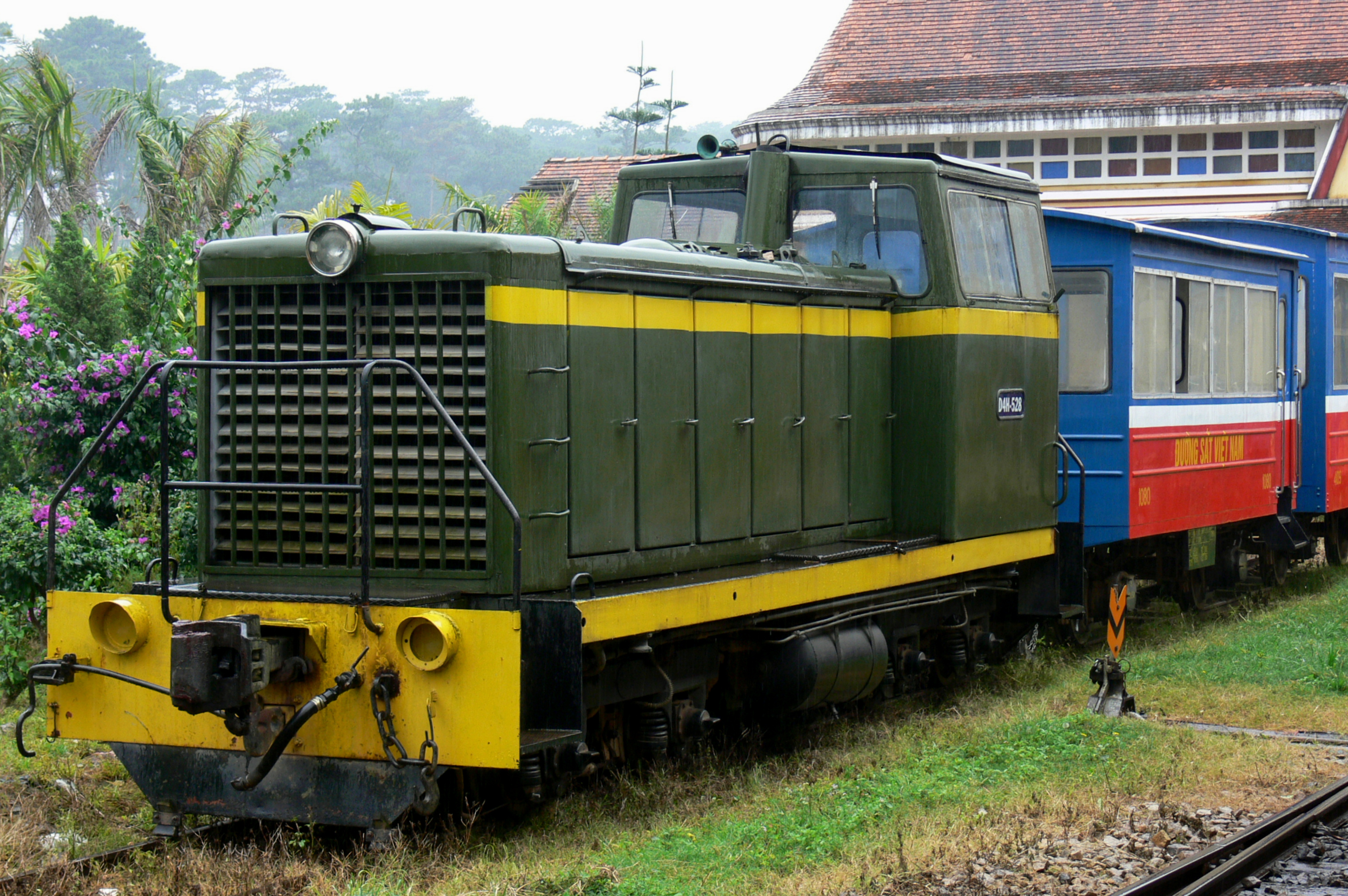
D4H-528, Da Lat–Thap Cham Railway

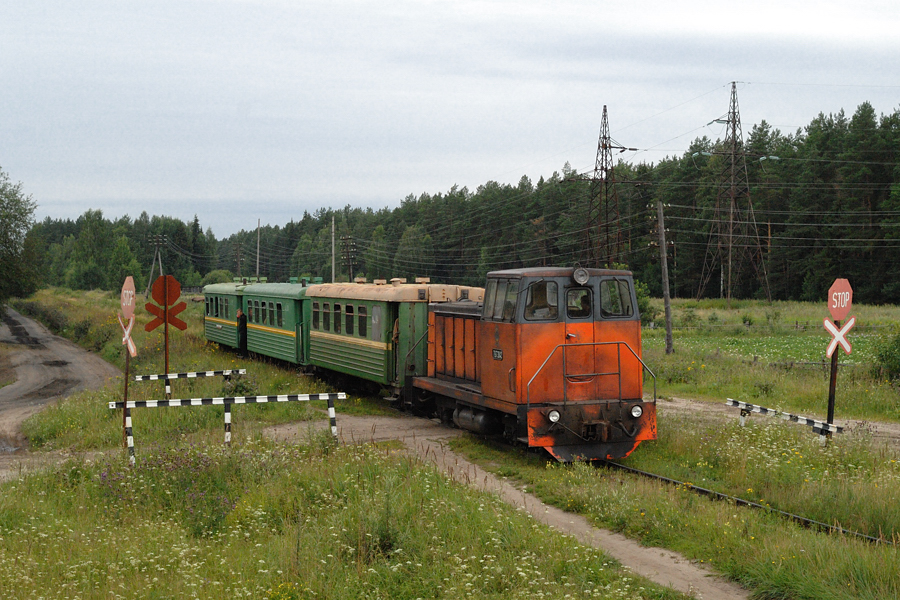
TU7A-3042, Kirov Oblast

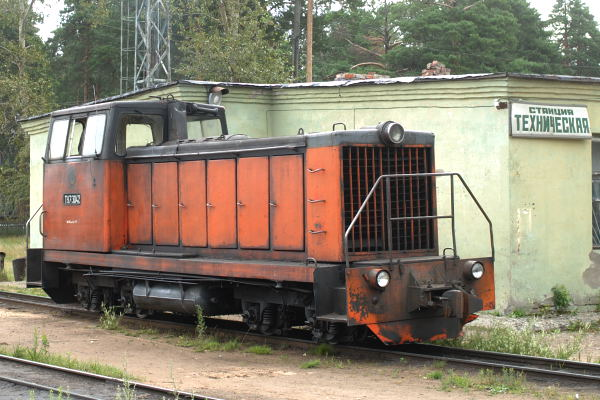
TU7A-3042, Kirov Oblast

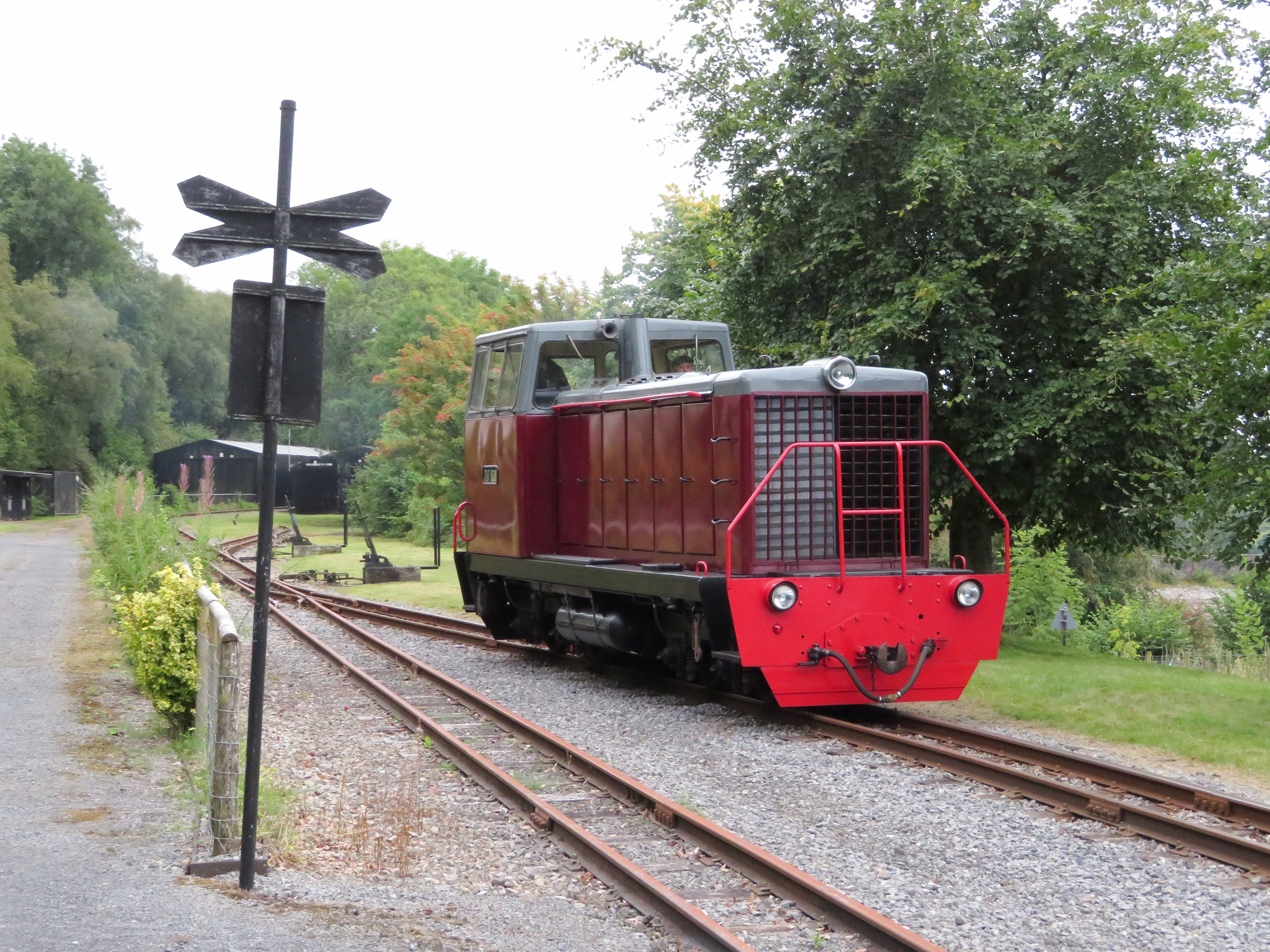
TU7-1698 returns to its train at Ponsticill (Brecon Mountain Railway) station after re-fuelling.

== See also ==
- Narrow-gauge railways in Russia
- Kambarka Engineering Works
