= Apsheronsk narrow-gauge railway =

Railway in Krasnodar Krai, Russia

Coordinates: 44.24670°N 39.76522°E

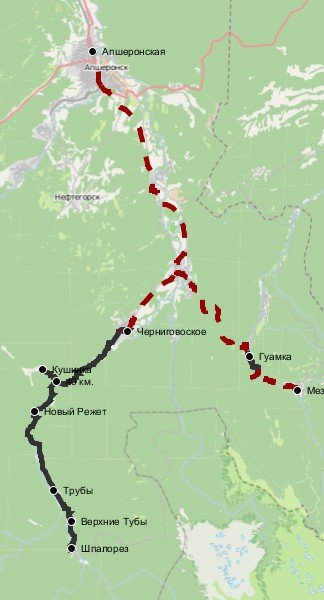
- Map of the railway (only grey-coloured full lines were operational in 2010–17)

Overview
- Locale: Krasnodar Krai, Russia
- Website: апшеронскаяужд.рф

Service
- Type: Narrow gauge railway
- Operator: ЗАО «ПДК Апшеронск»

History
- Opened: 1927

Technical
- Line length: 37 kilometres (23 mi)
- Track gauge: 750 mm (2 ft 5 1/2 in)

The Apsheronsk narrow-gauge railway (Russian: Апшеронская узкоколейная железная дорога, Apsheronskya uzkokoleynaya zheleznaya doroga) is a mountain narrow-gauge railway located in Krasnodar Krai, Russia. It was opened in 1927 and built in the standard Russian narrow-gauge track gauge of 750 mm (2 ft 5 1/2 in).

== Current status ==
Map of operating lines (2020)

The length of the railway as of 2010 is 127 kilometres (79 mi) of which 37 kilometres (23 mi) is operational. It carries freight (including: wood, food, and postal services) and passengers, including a train which transports children to school. The Head Office of the railway is located in Apsheronsk.

== Rolling stock ==
=== Locomotives ===
- TU7 – № 2540, 2629
- TU7A – № 3219
- TU6P - № 0053
- TU8P - № 0005
- GMD-4 railcar
- TD-5U «Pioneer» - transportation for local residents

=== Locomotives Shpalorez-Express ===
- TU4 – № 3003
- TU7A – № 3307
- TU8 – № 0148

=== Railroad car ===
- Boxcar
- Flatcars
- Snowplow СО750
- Passenger cars PV40
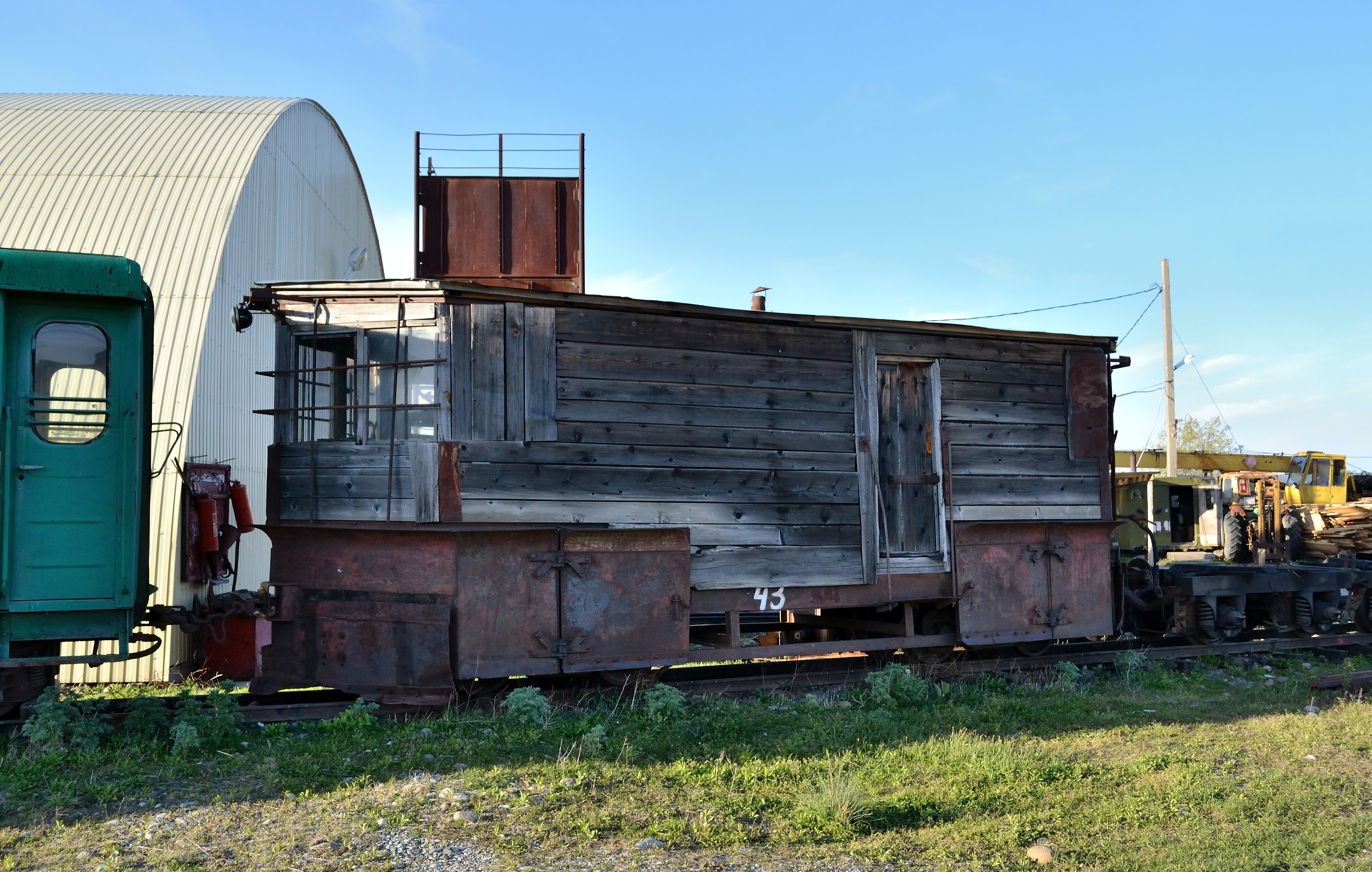
Snowplow СО750

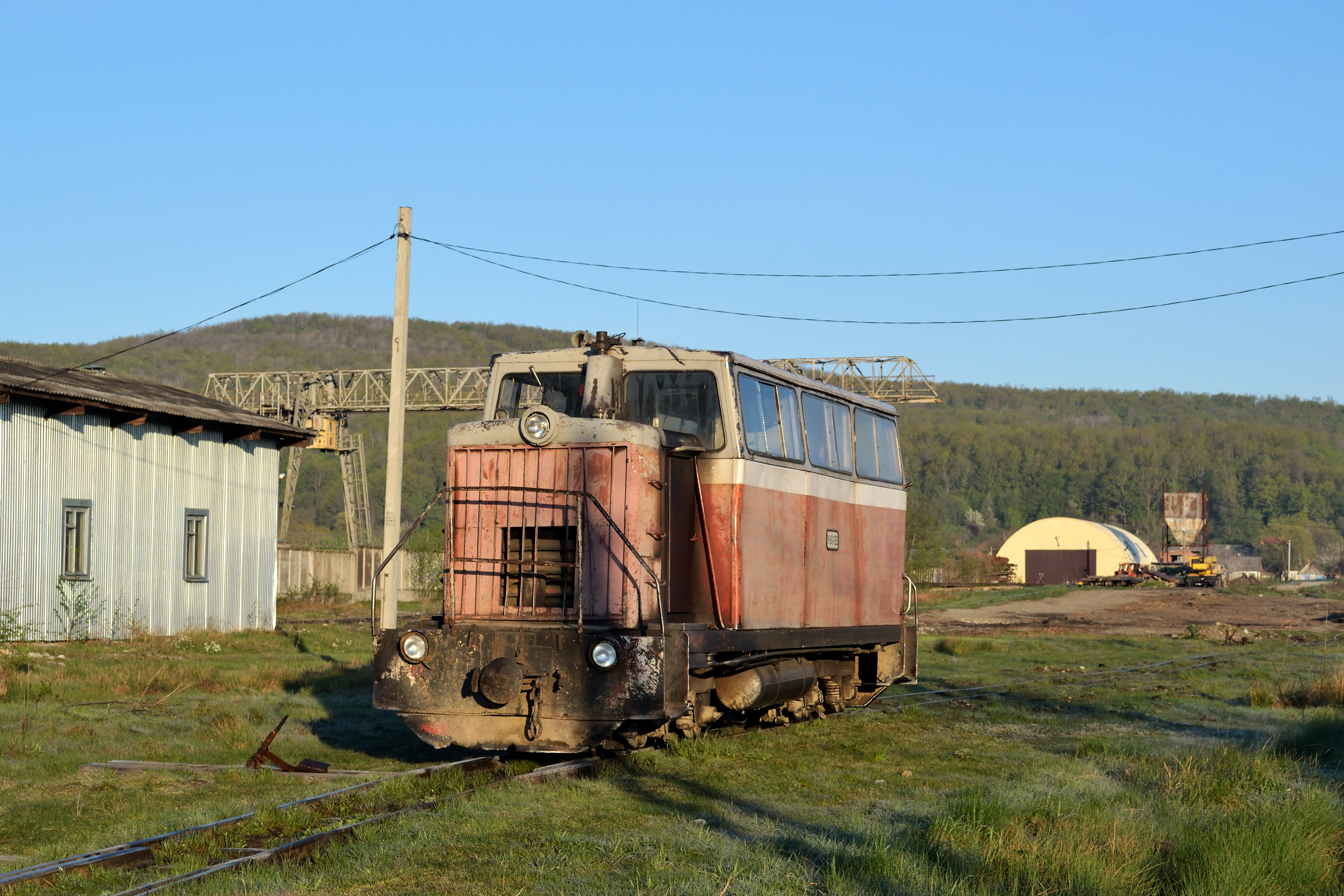
TU6P – № 0053

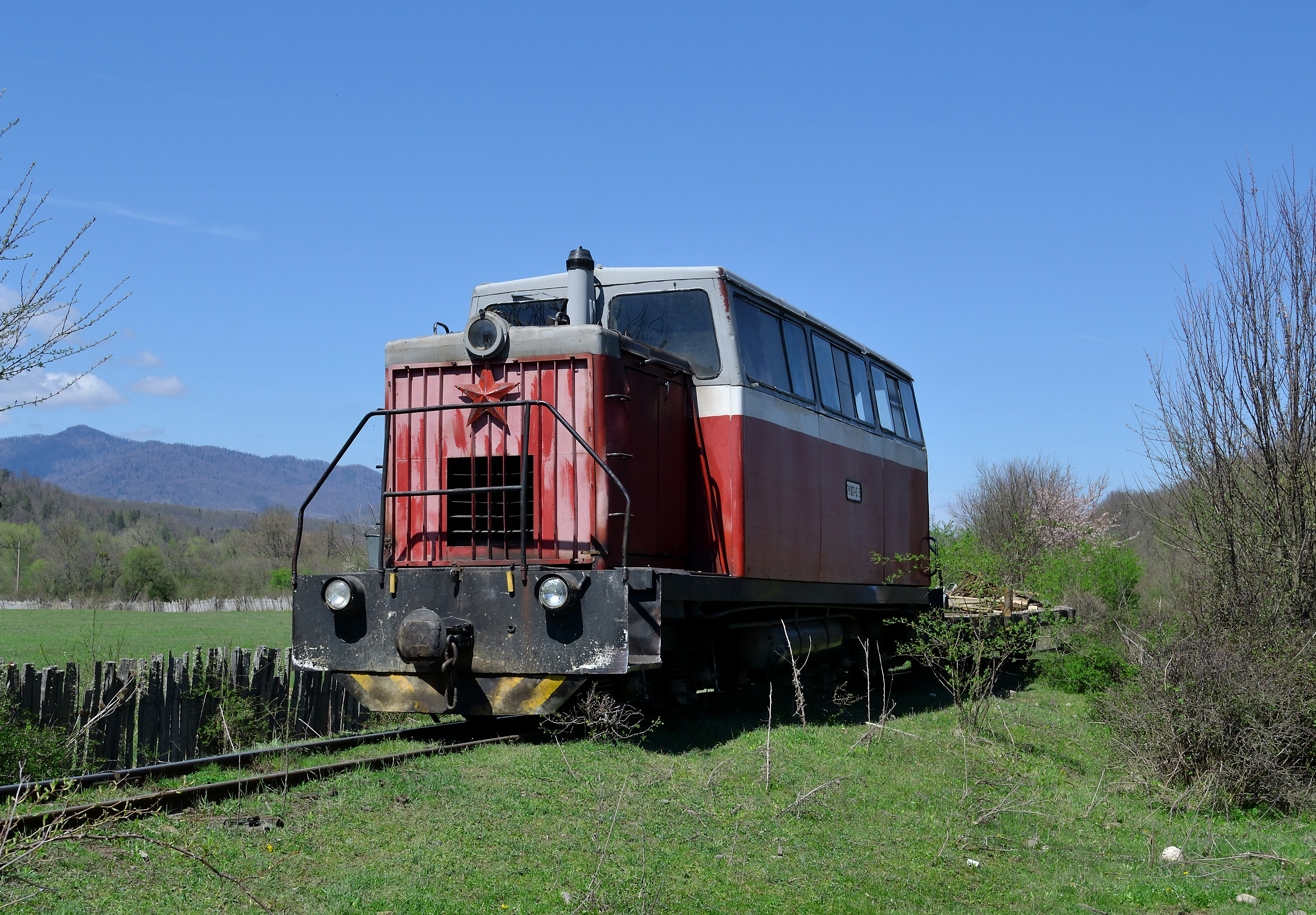
TU8P – № 0005

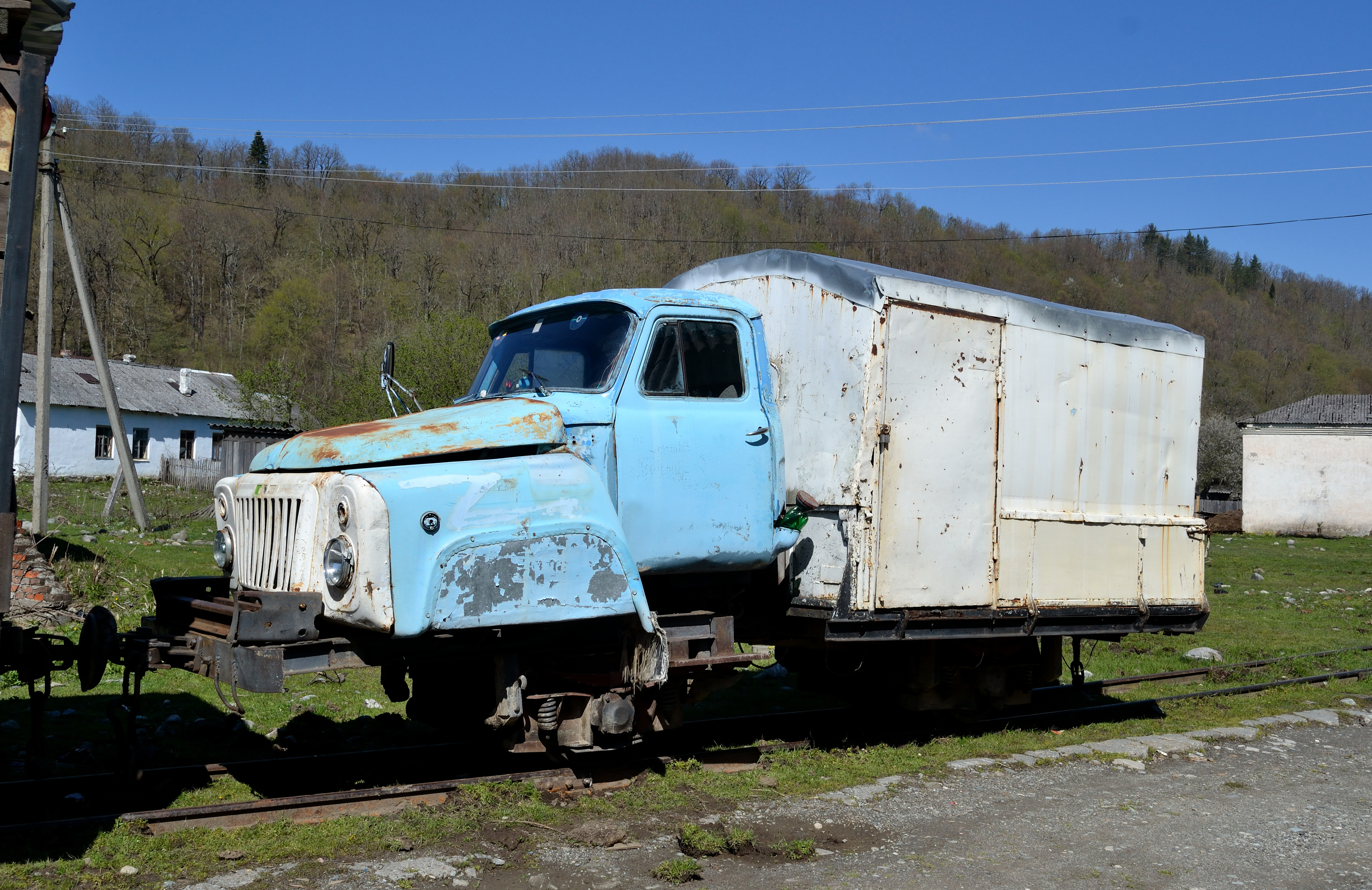
GMD-4 railcar

== Guamka Tourist Railway ==
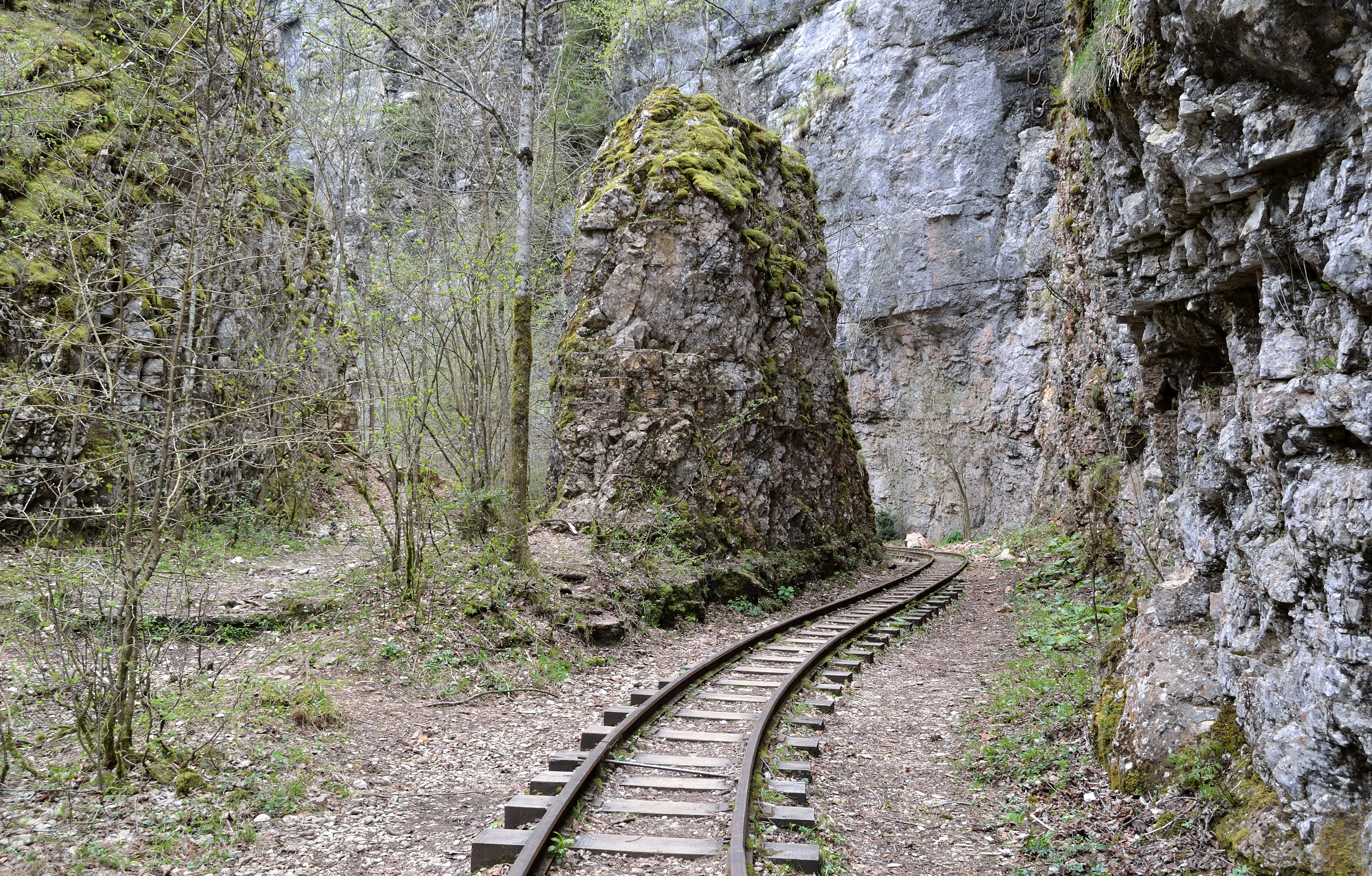
A picturesque part of the Guamka branch line

In stanitsa Samurskaya (part of village Novyye Polyany) the railroad was divided into two lines – a branch line turned left from the main line, on southwest, into the mountains of southern Adygea, where it ended in settlement Guzeripl (via tourist resort Lago-Naki). Terminal parts of this line have been canceled already during the 70's, while in the end of the 80's has been dismantled connection with the main line. Presently remains isolated section of this branch line, roughly 8 kilometres length, which goes through attractive gorge of the Kurdzhips River between settlements Guamka and Mezmay. This railroad is since 2017, after repairing of serious damages caused by landslides, used for tourist transport only.

=== Locomotives ===
- TU8 – № 0427

=== Railroad car ===
- Passenger cars PV40
- Snowplow СО750
- Tank car
- Flatcars
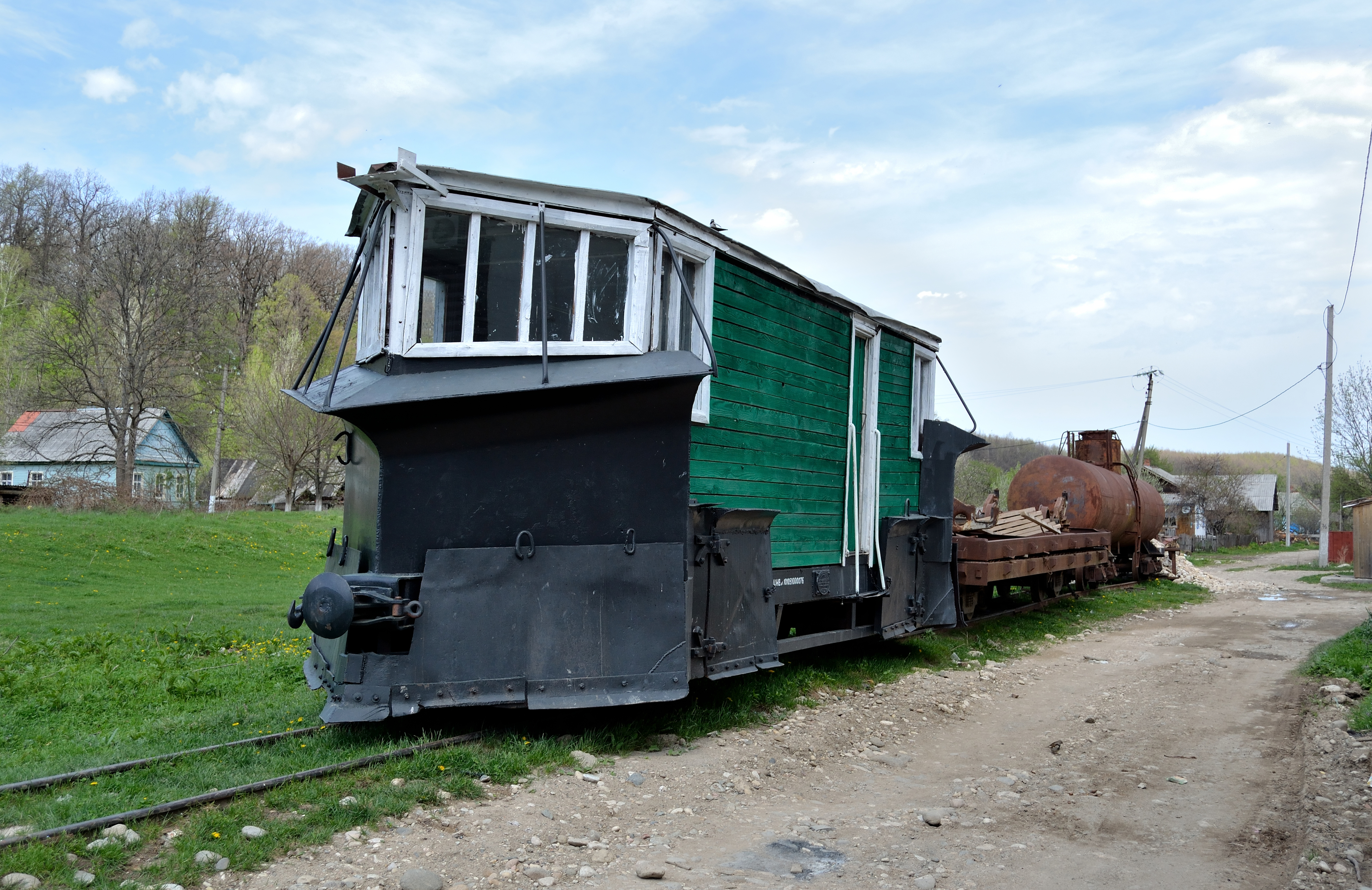
Snowplow СО750

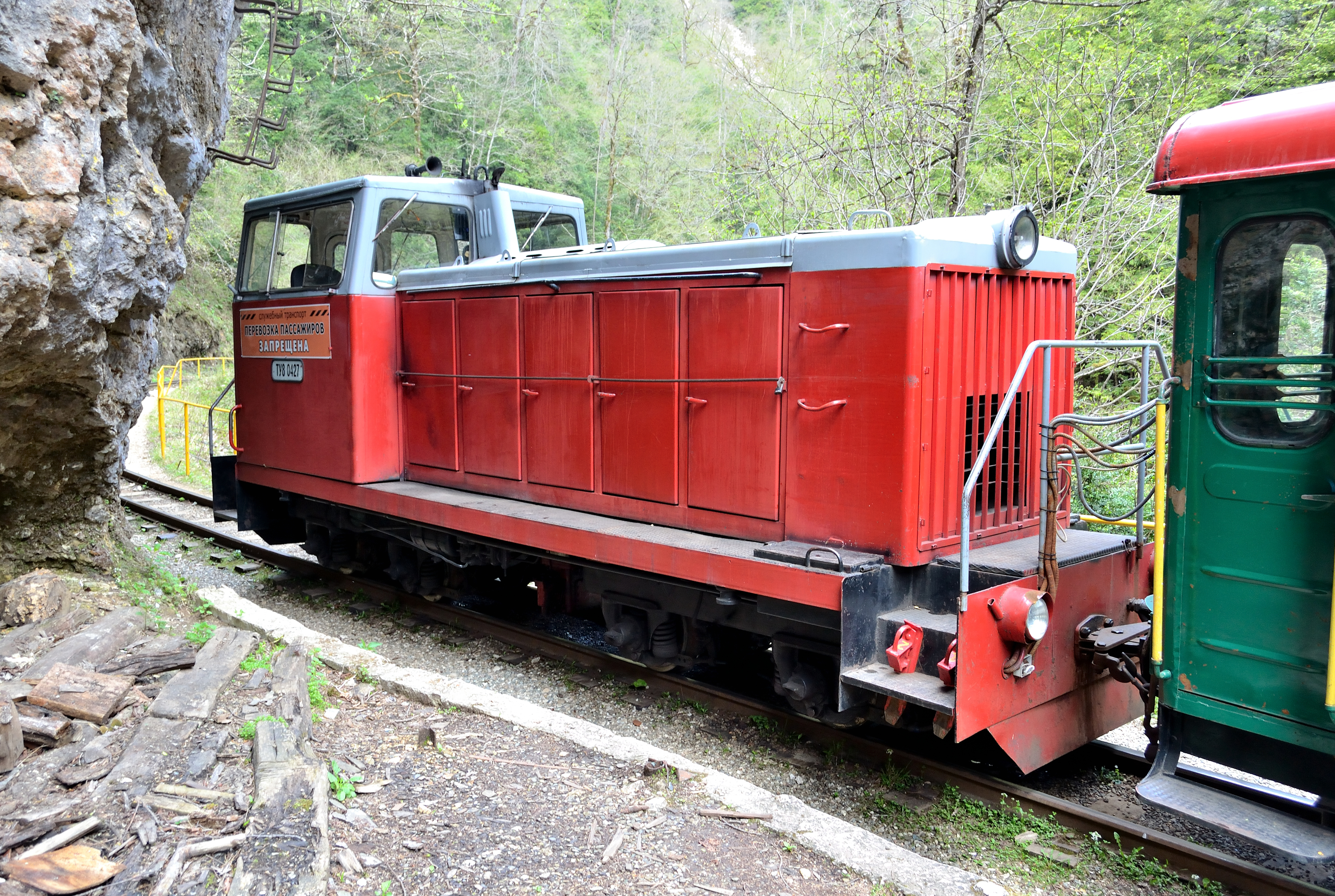
TU8 – № 0427

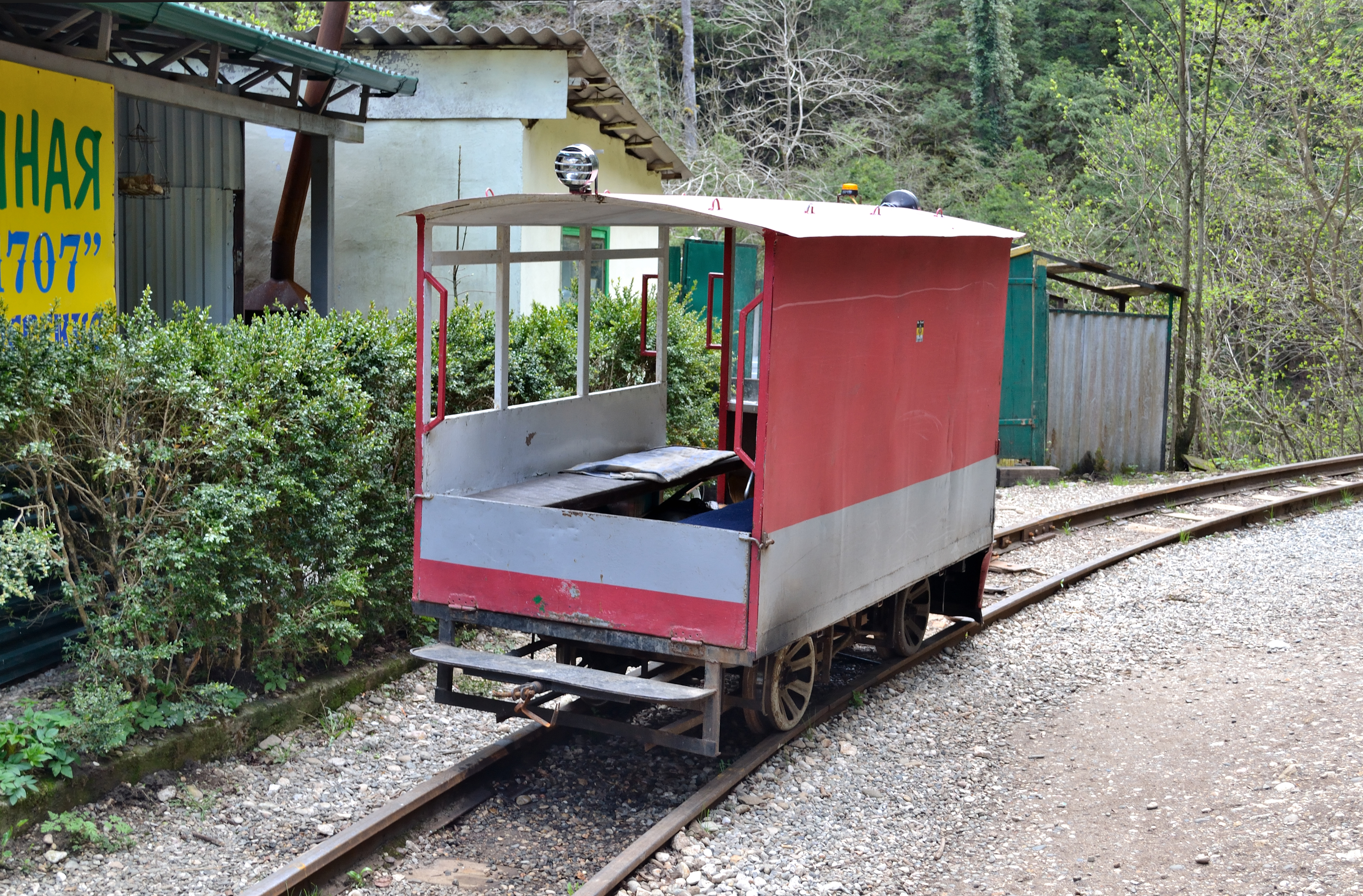
TD-5U «Pioneer»

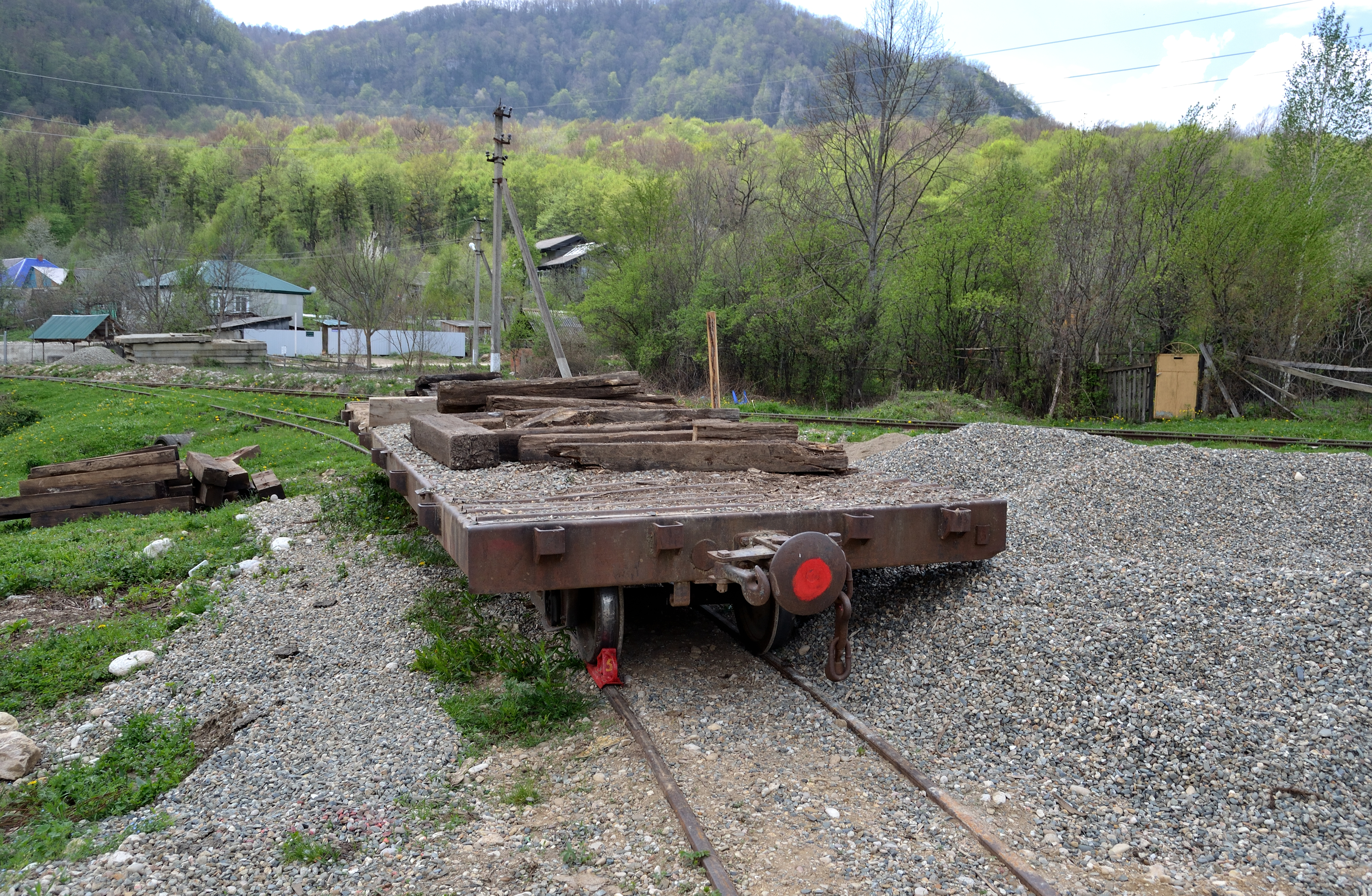
Flatcar

== Stations ==
- 00 km - Apsheronsk (The track was dismantled in 2010)
- 15 km - 15 km (The track was dismantled in 2010)
- 24 km - Samurskaya (The track was dismantled in 2010)
- 31 km - Chernigovskoye
- 40 km - Passing loop "10 km" - Kushinka
- 44 km - Rezhet
- 48 km - Lower Tubyi
- 52 km - Middle Tubyi
- 59 km - Otdalenyy (formerly Shpalorez)

== Gallery ==
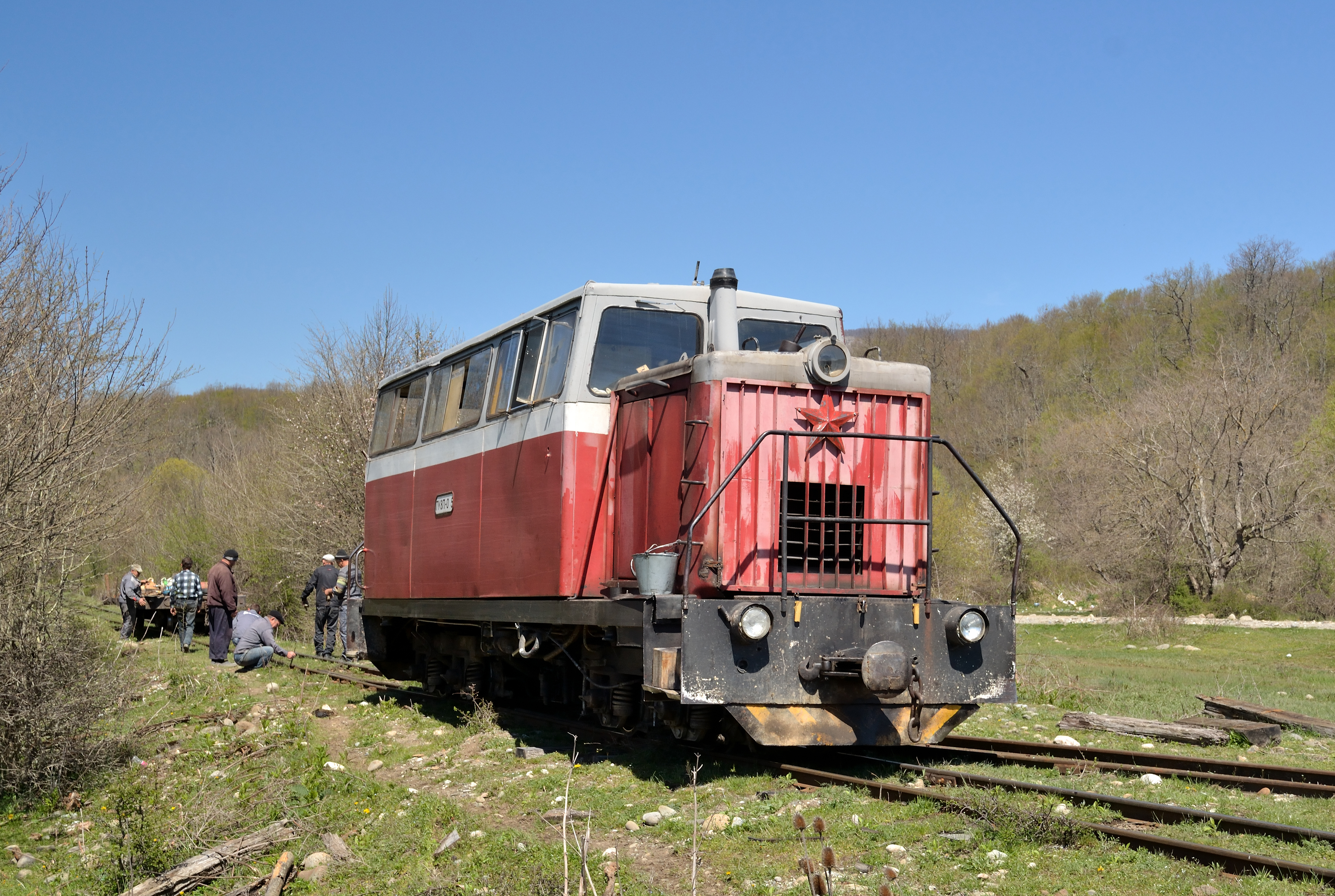
TU8P – № 0005, station Tubyi

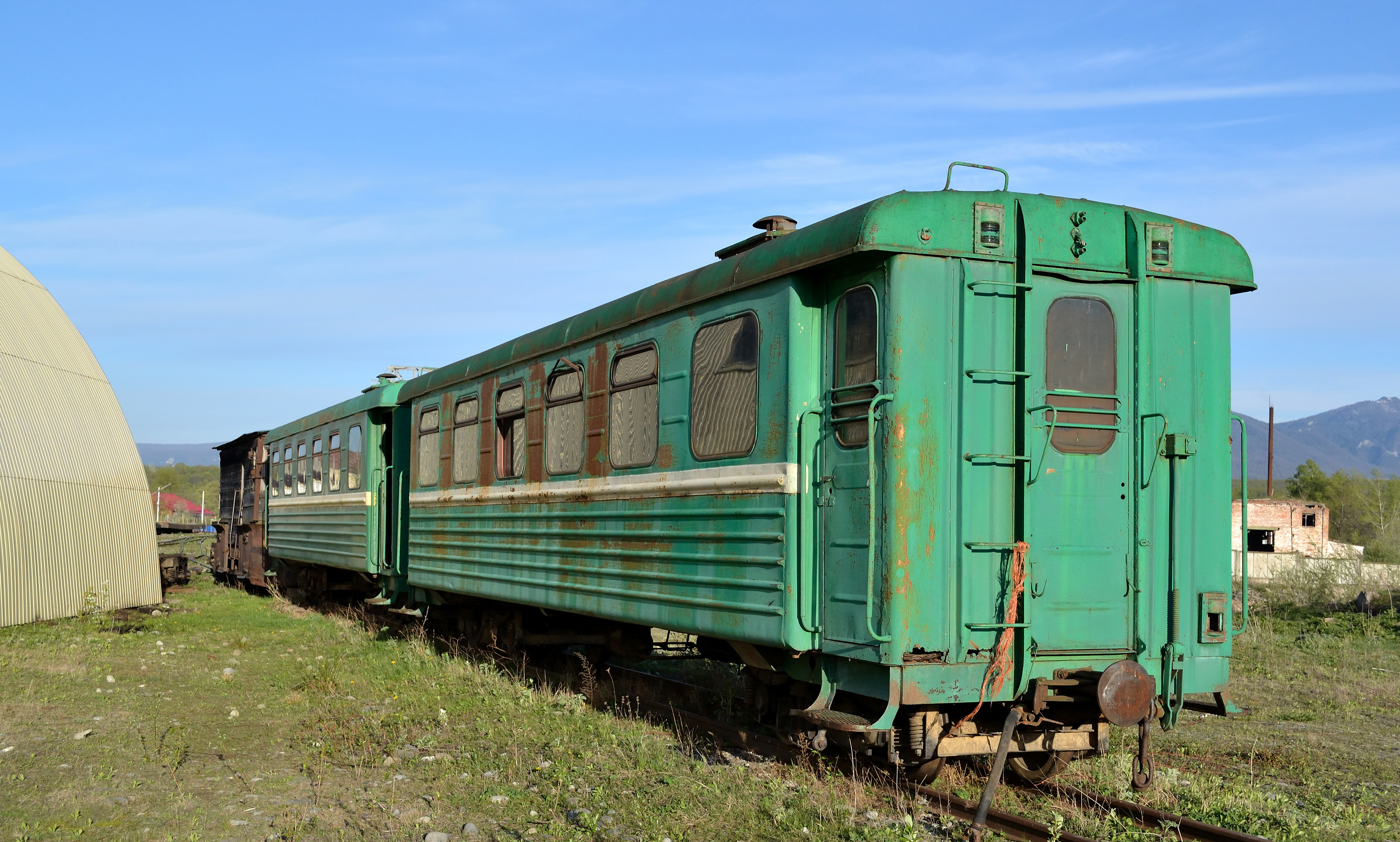
Passenger cars PV40, station Chernigovskoye

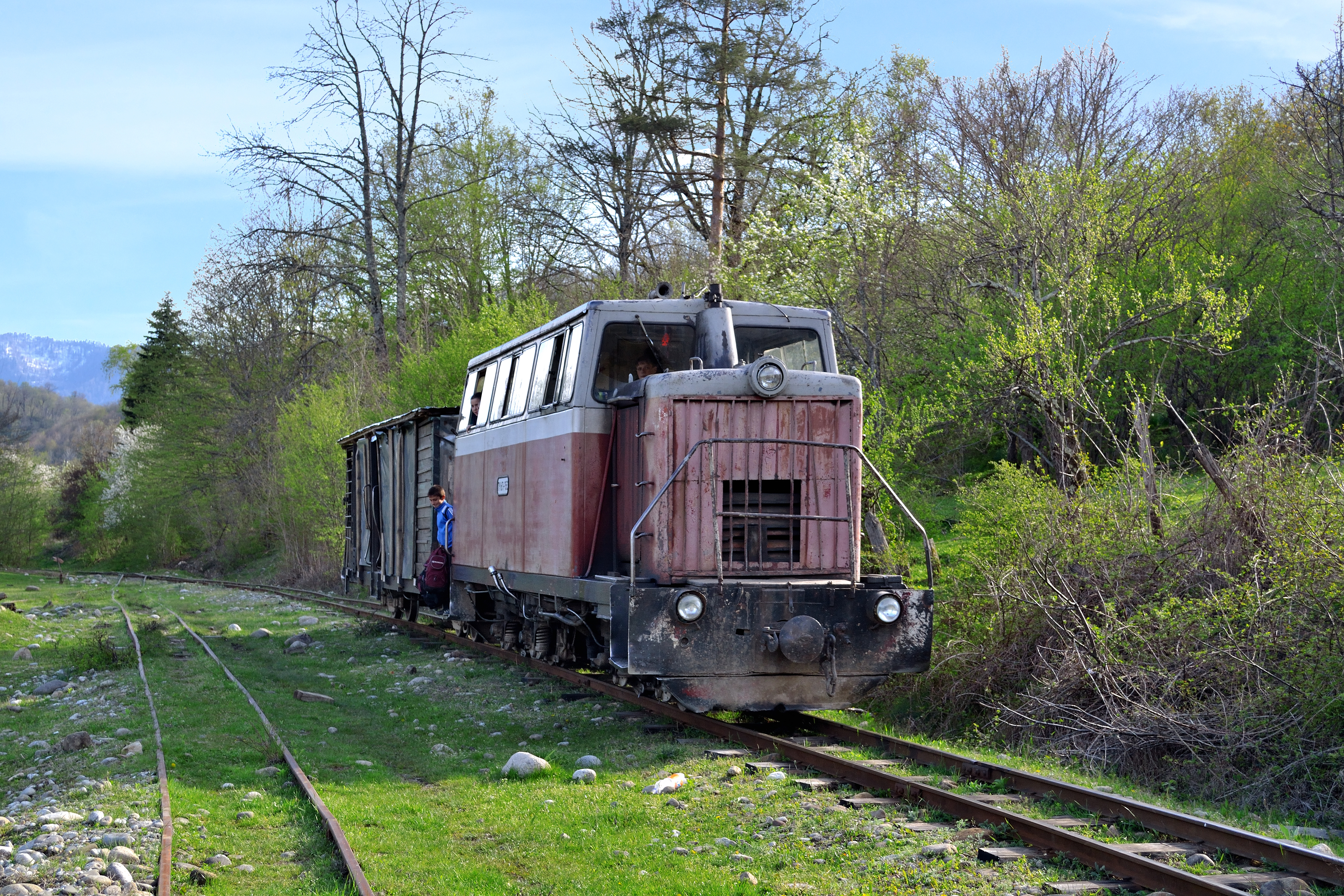
TU6P – № 0053, station Rezhet

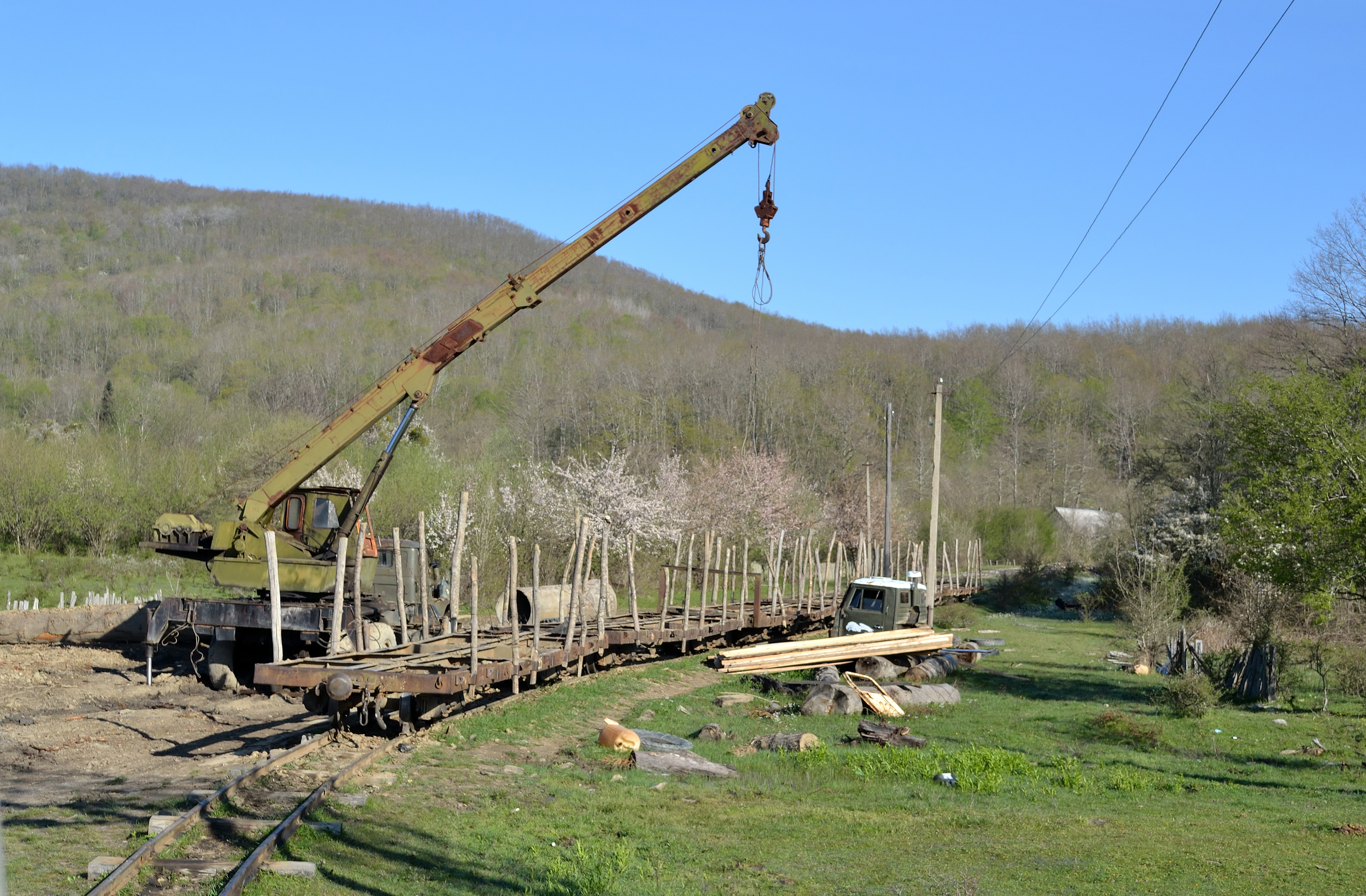
Flatcars, station Kushinka

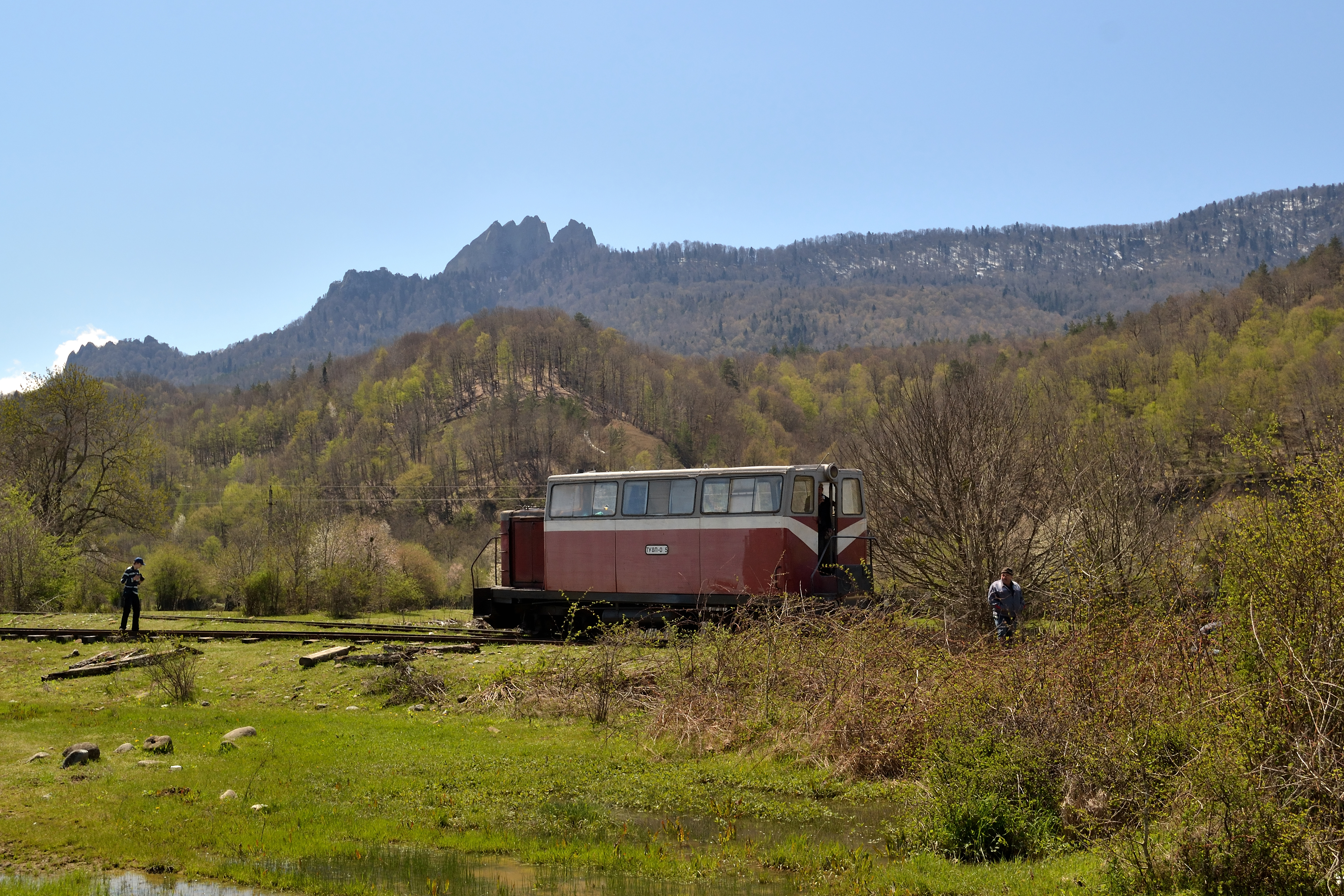
TU8P – № 0005, station Tubyi

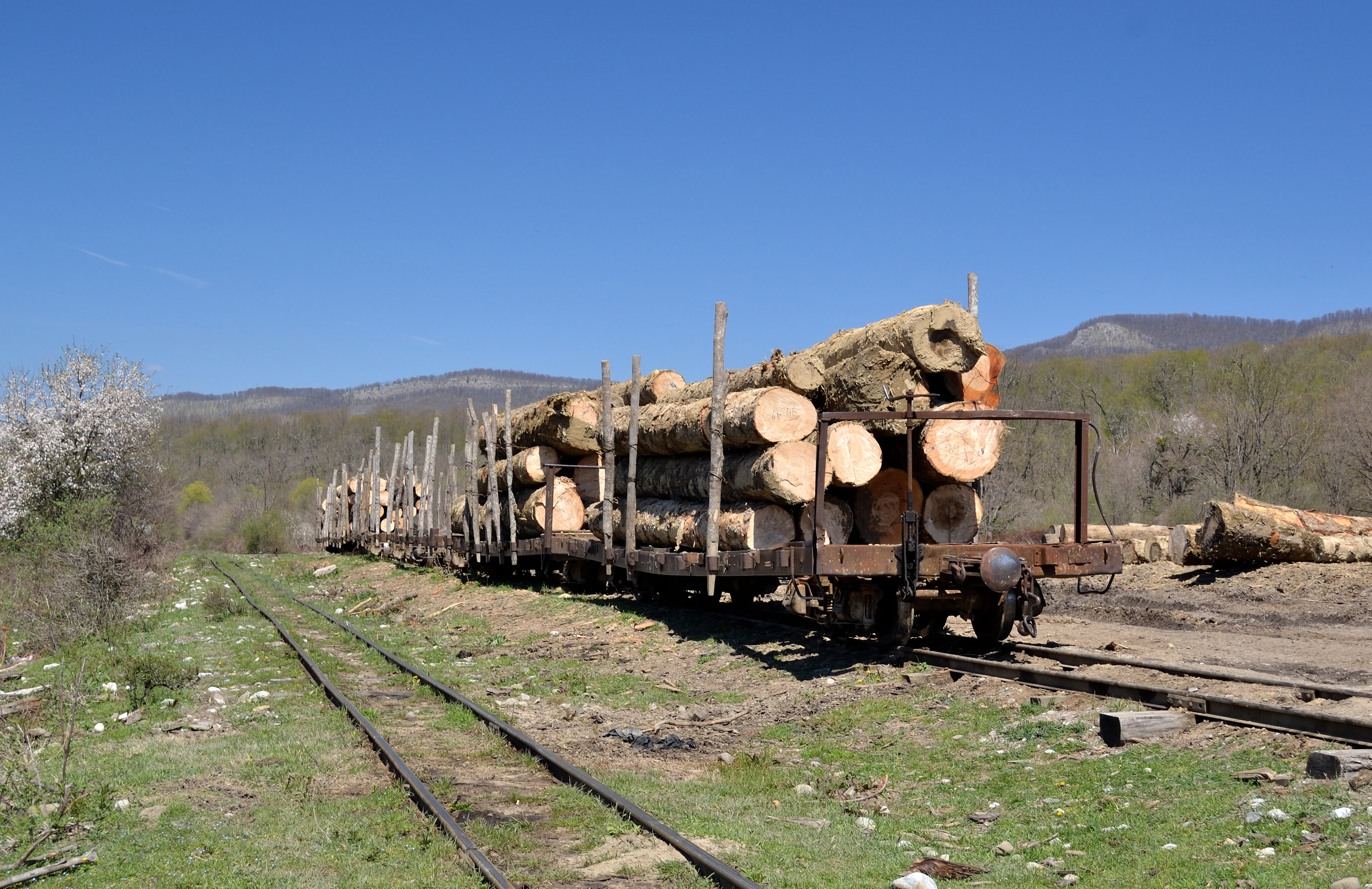
Log-cars, station Tubyi

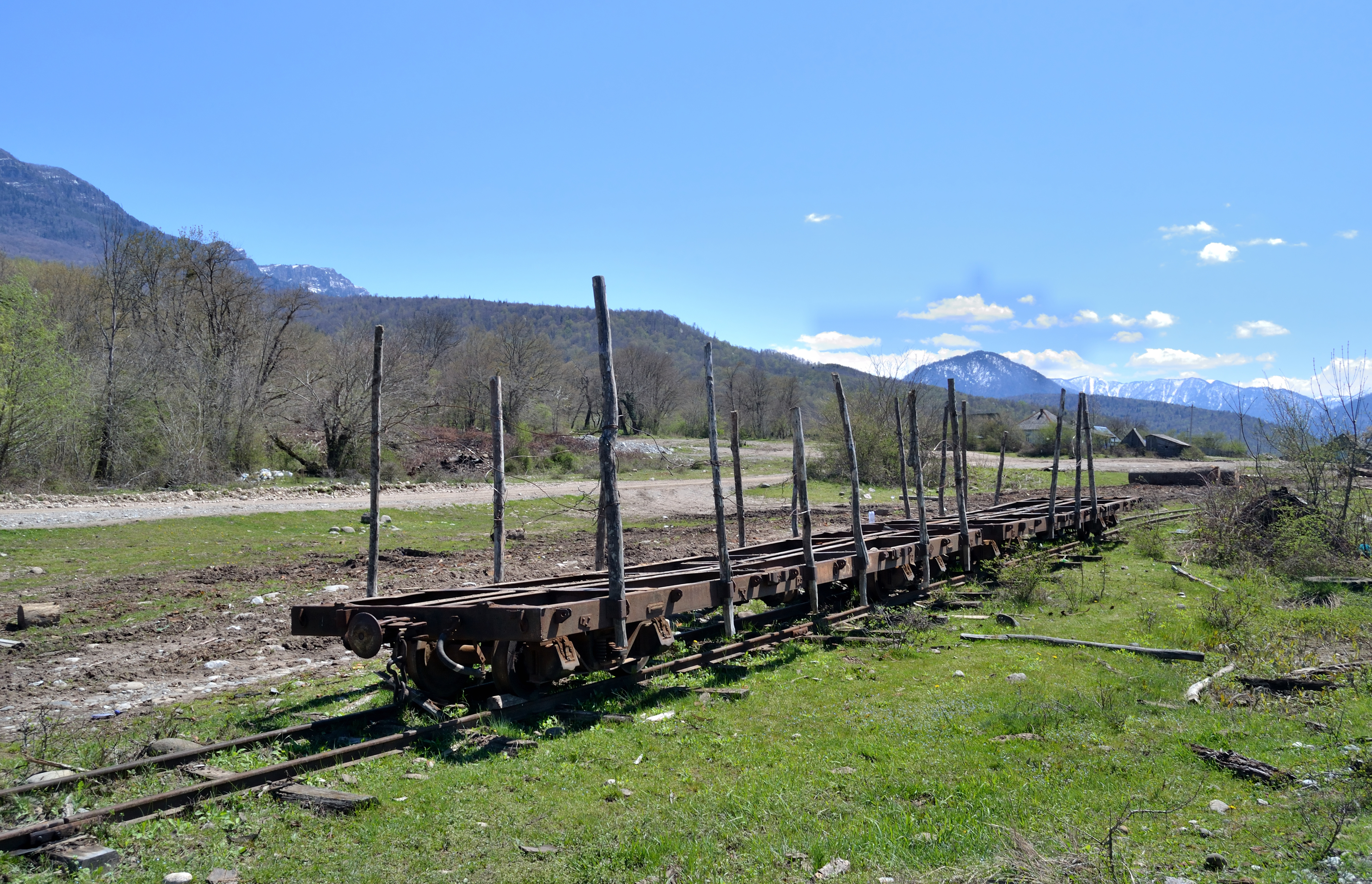
Log-cars, station Tubyi

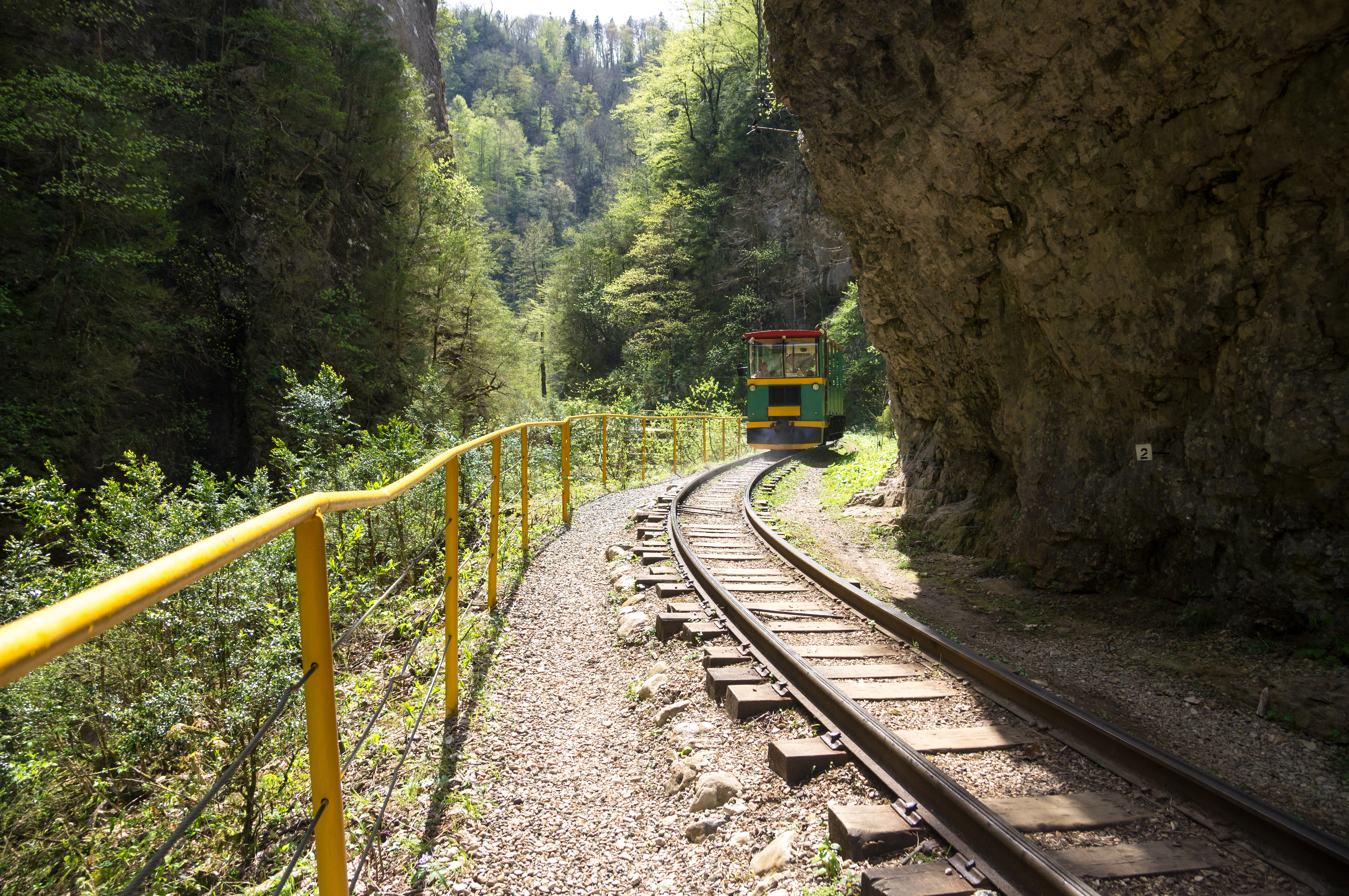
Guam Canyon

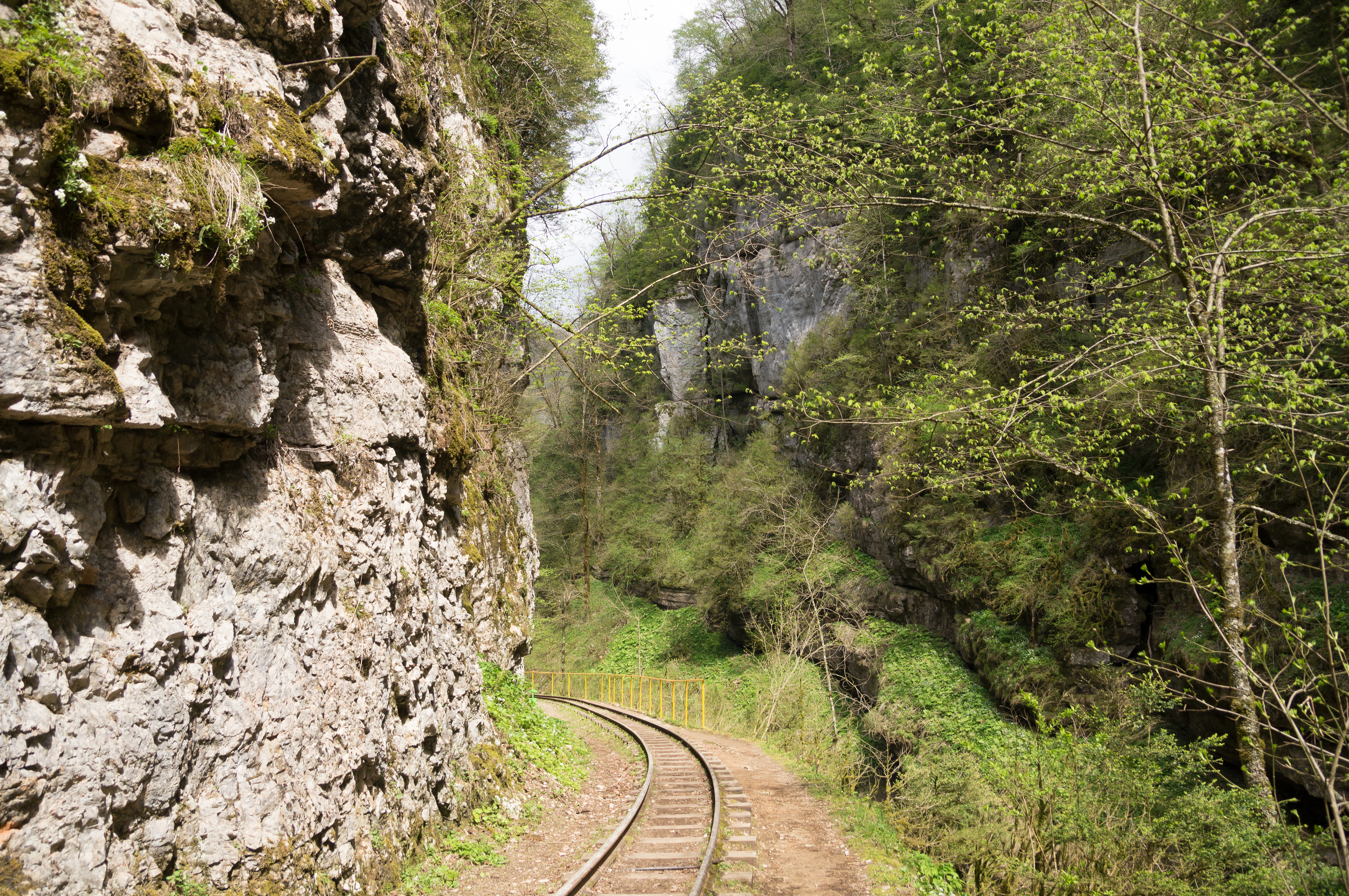
Guam Canyon

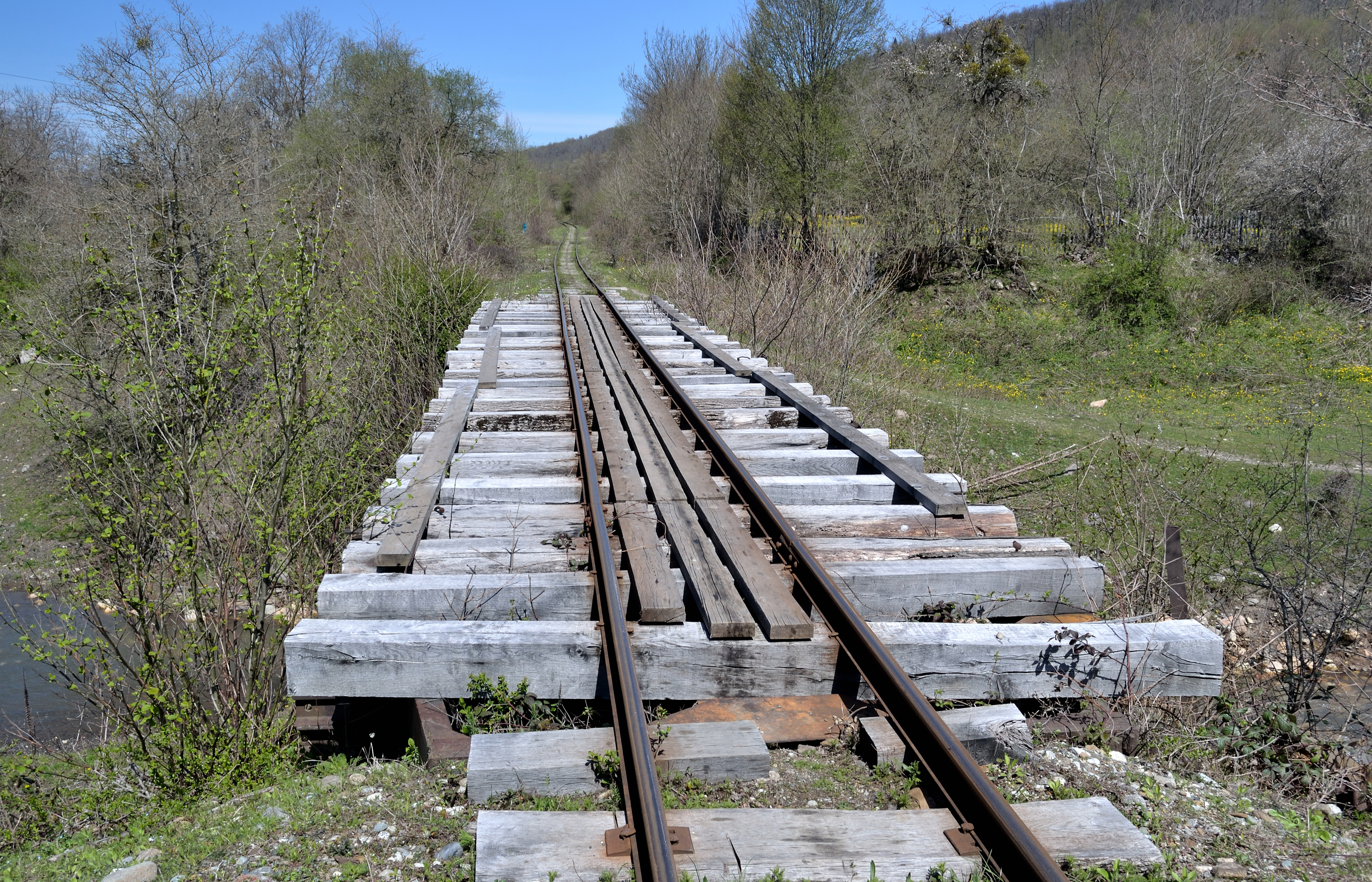
Bridge

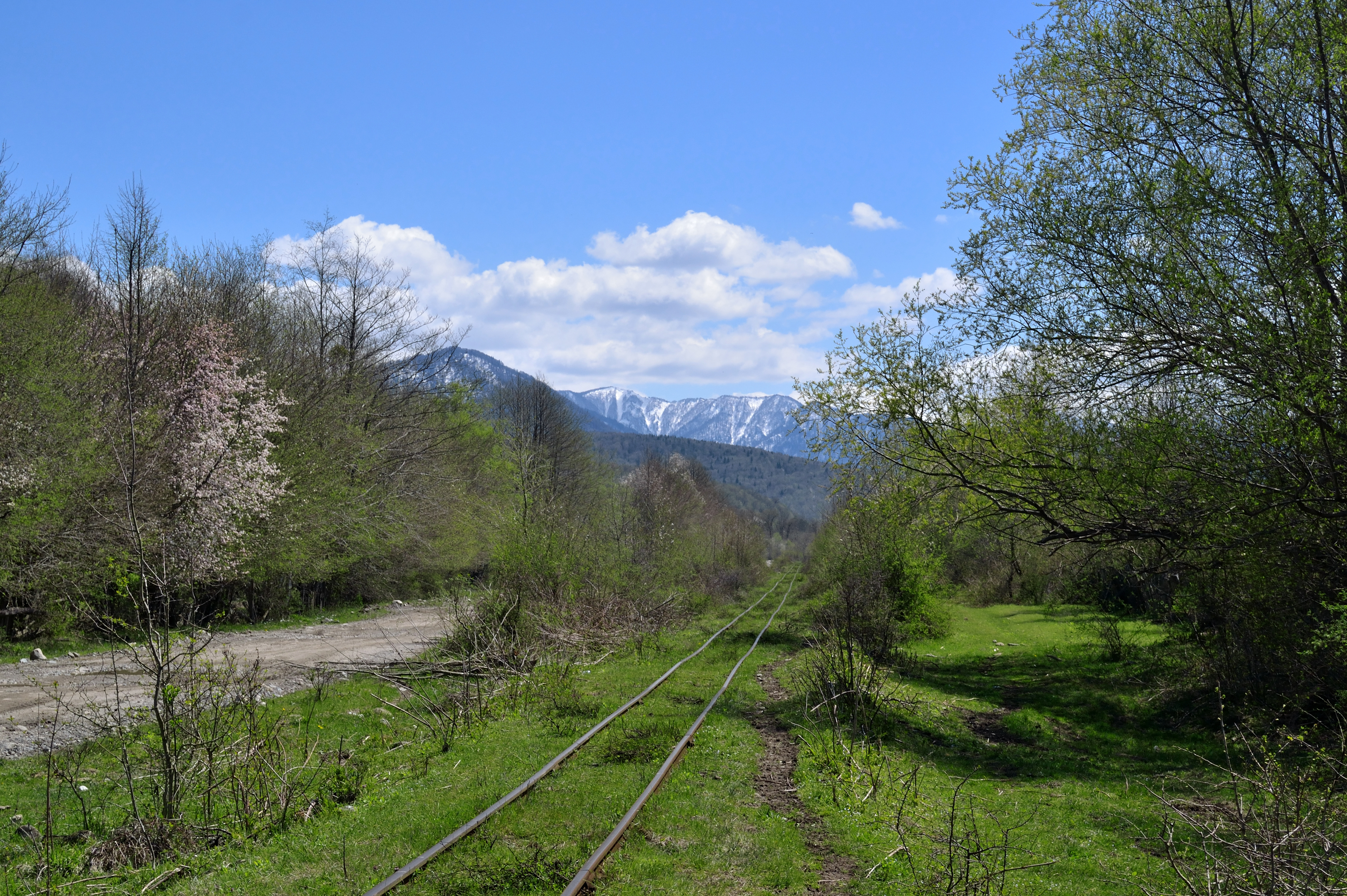
Forest railway

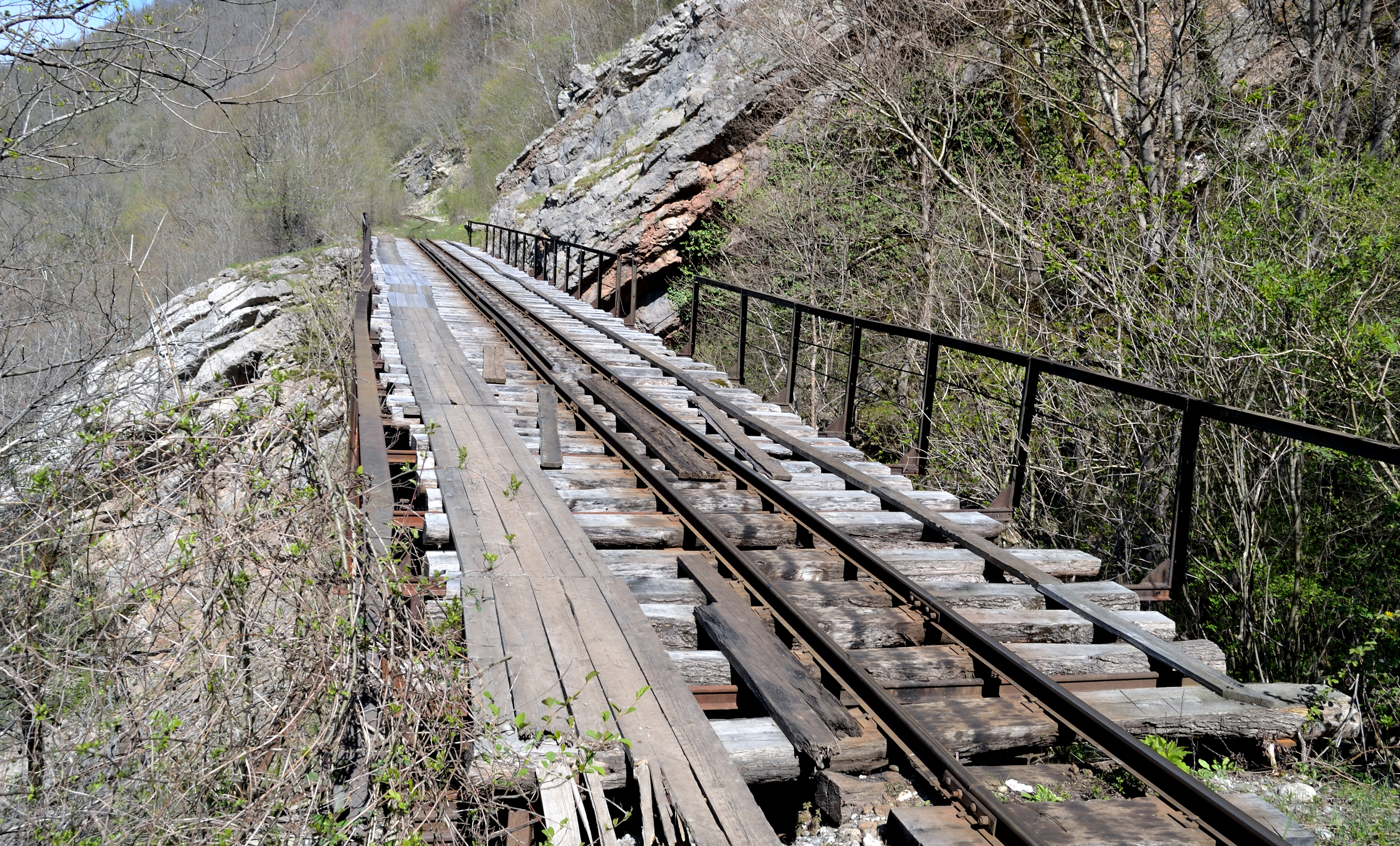
Red Bridge

== See also ==
- Narrow-gauge railways in Russia
