= TU8P =

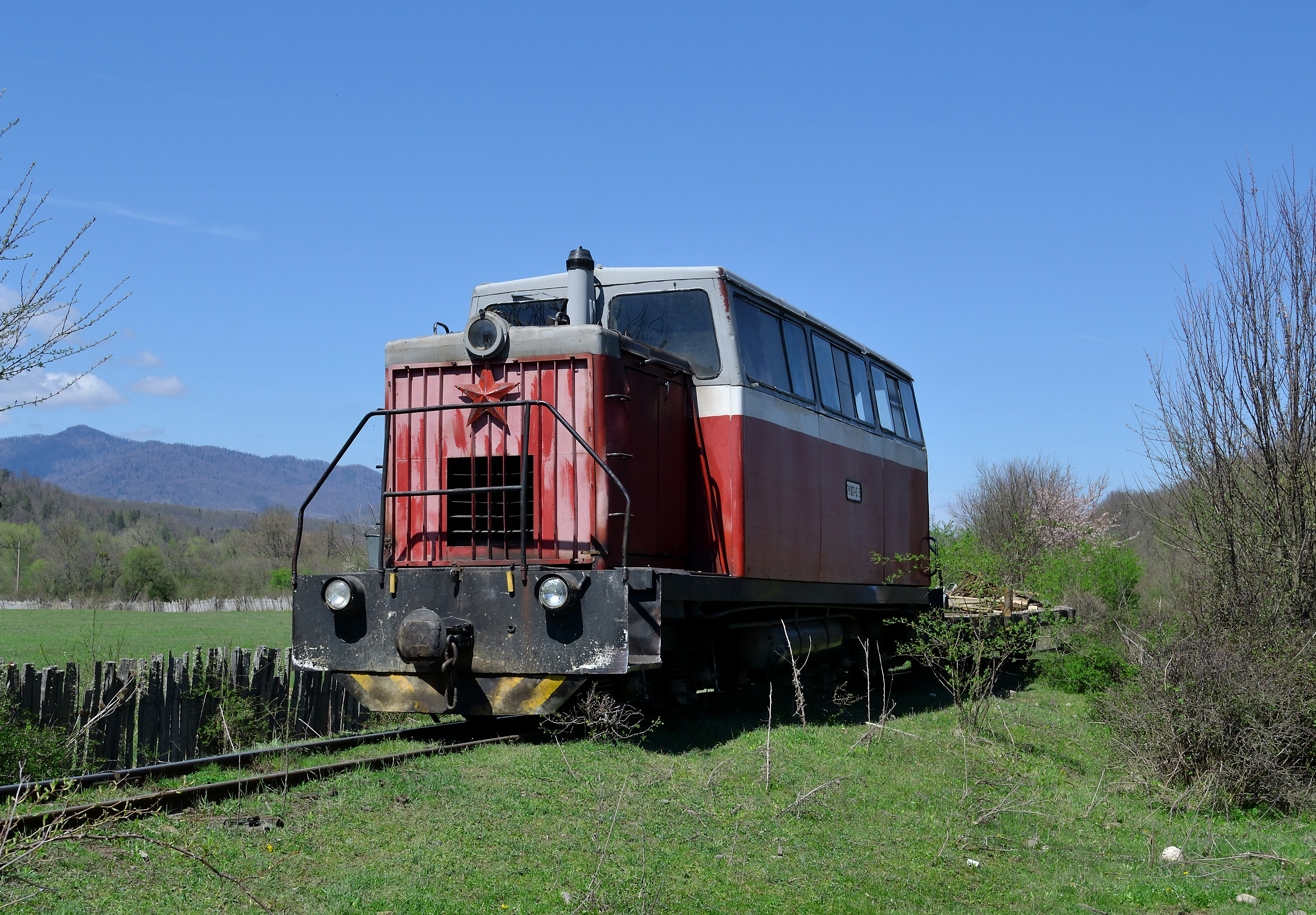
Type and origin
- Power type: Diesel
- Builder: Kambarka Engineering Works
- Build date: 1988 - present
Specifications
- Configuration
  - UIC: B'B'
- Gauge: 750 mm (2 ft 5 1/2 in) to 1,520 mm (4 ft 11 27/32 in) Russian gauge
- Wheel diameter: 600 mm (23.62 in)
- Minimum curve: 40 m (131.23 ft)
- Length: 9,730 mm (383 1/8 in)
- Width: 2,300 mm (90 1/2 in)
- Height: 2,290 mm (90 1/8 in)
- Axle load: 4 metric tons (4.4 short tons; 3.9 long tons)
- Loco weight: 16 metric tons (17.6 short tons; 15.7 long tons)
- Fuel type: Diesel
- Prime mover: ЯМЗ-236М
- Engine type: V-shaped
- Transmission: mechanical
Performance figures
- Maximum speed: 63 km/h (39 mph)
- Power output: 180 horsepower (130 kW)
Career
- Class: Russia - TU8P / (ТУ8П); Ukraine - TU8P / (ТУ8П); Uzbekistan - TU8P / (ТУ8П); Vietnam - TU6P

TU8P (ТУ8П) is a Soviet, later Russian diesel locomotive, railcar or draisine for gauge 750 mm (2 ft 5 1/2 in).

== History ==
The TU8P (ТУ8П) is used for passenger transport on narrow gauge railways. The TU8P was developed in 1987 - 1988 at the Kambarka Engineering Works to replace the ageing locomotive class TU6P (ТУ6П). The TU8P was designed to be used on any gauge from 750 mm (2 ft 5 1/2 in) to 1,520 mm (4 ft 11 27/32 in). The cab is equipped with a heat-system, refrigerator, radio-set and air conditioning. The first diesel locomotive TU8P - № 0001 was delivered to the narrow gauge railway KSM-№2 with track gauge 750 mm (2 ft 5 1/2 in), TU8P diesel locomotive № 0007, 0008, 0056, 0057 were built with track 1,067 mm (3 ft 6 in) for the Sakhalin Railway. The TU8P (TY6P) motor railcar currently used on the Vietnamese railway network. The diesel locomotive TU8P & series AMD-1 (АМД-1) are for railway track monitoring and inspection for the Russian railways with the track 1,520 mm (4 ft 11 27/32 in). The TU8P diesel locomotive № 0003 - 0004 were built for the Uzbekistan with the track gauge 750 mm (2 ft 5 1/2 in).

== Additional specifications ==
- Number of seats in the cabin - 14
- Distance between bogies - 4,000 mm (157.48 in)
- Base of bogies - 1,400 mm (55.12 in)

== Gallery ==
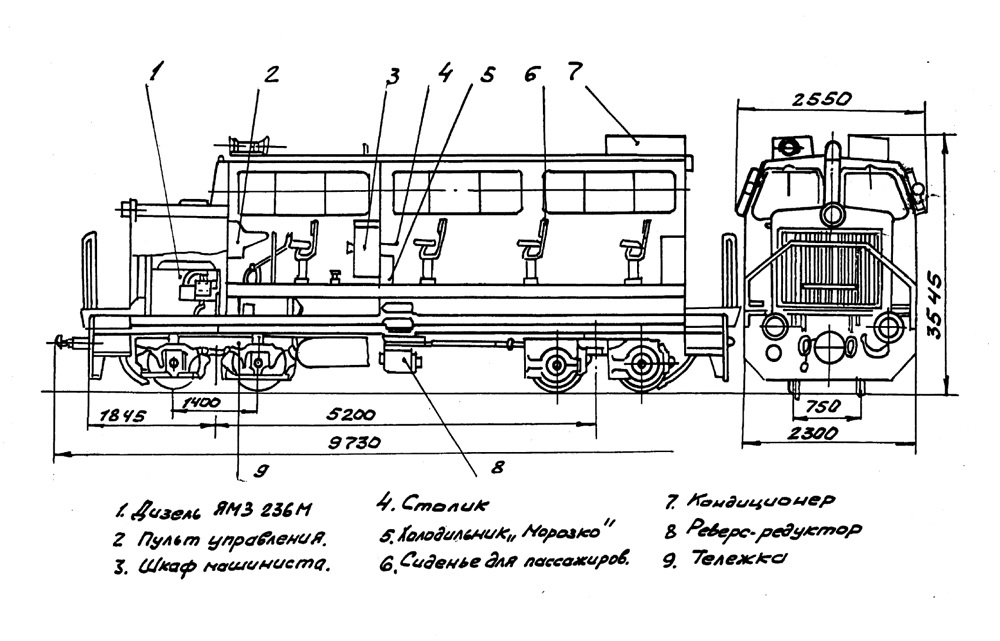
Technical drawing - TU8P

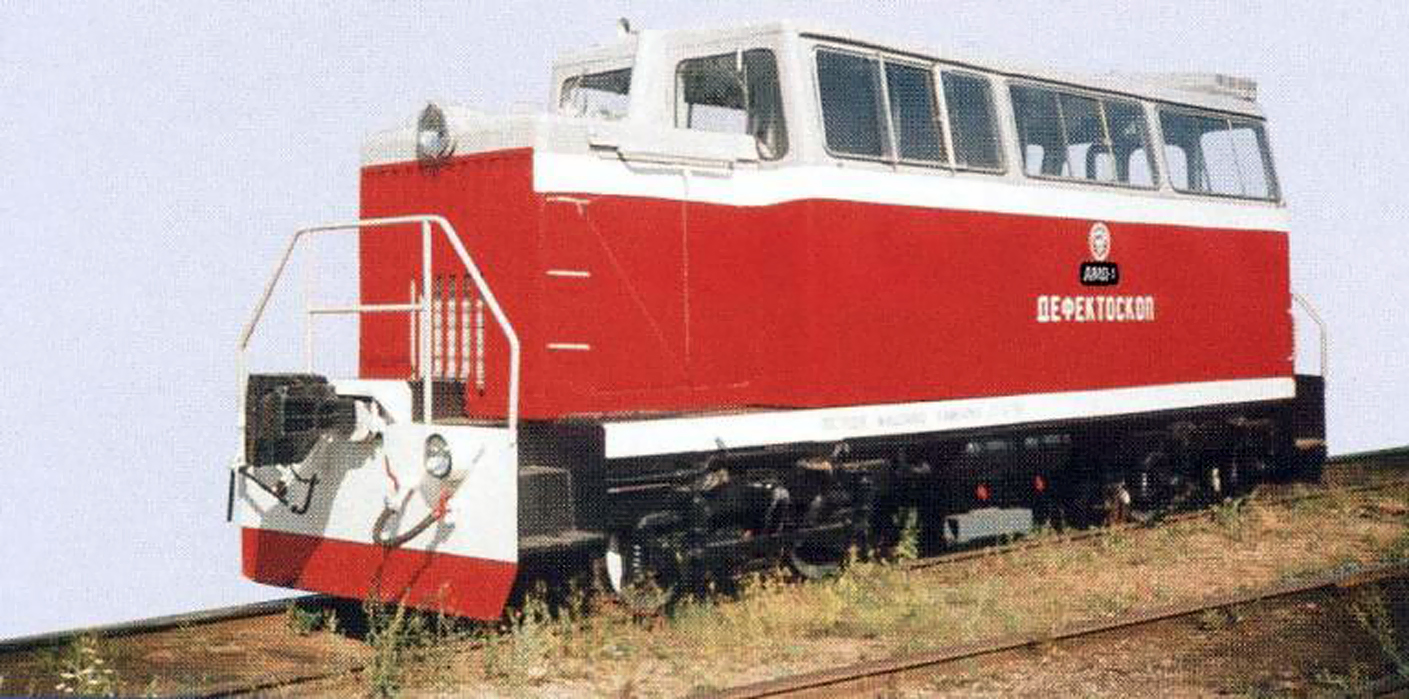
AMD-1 (TU8P), Kambarka

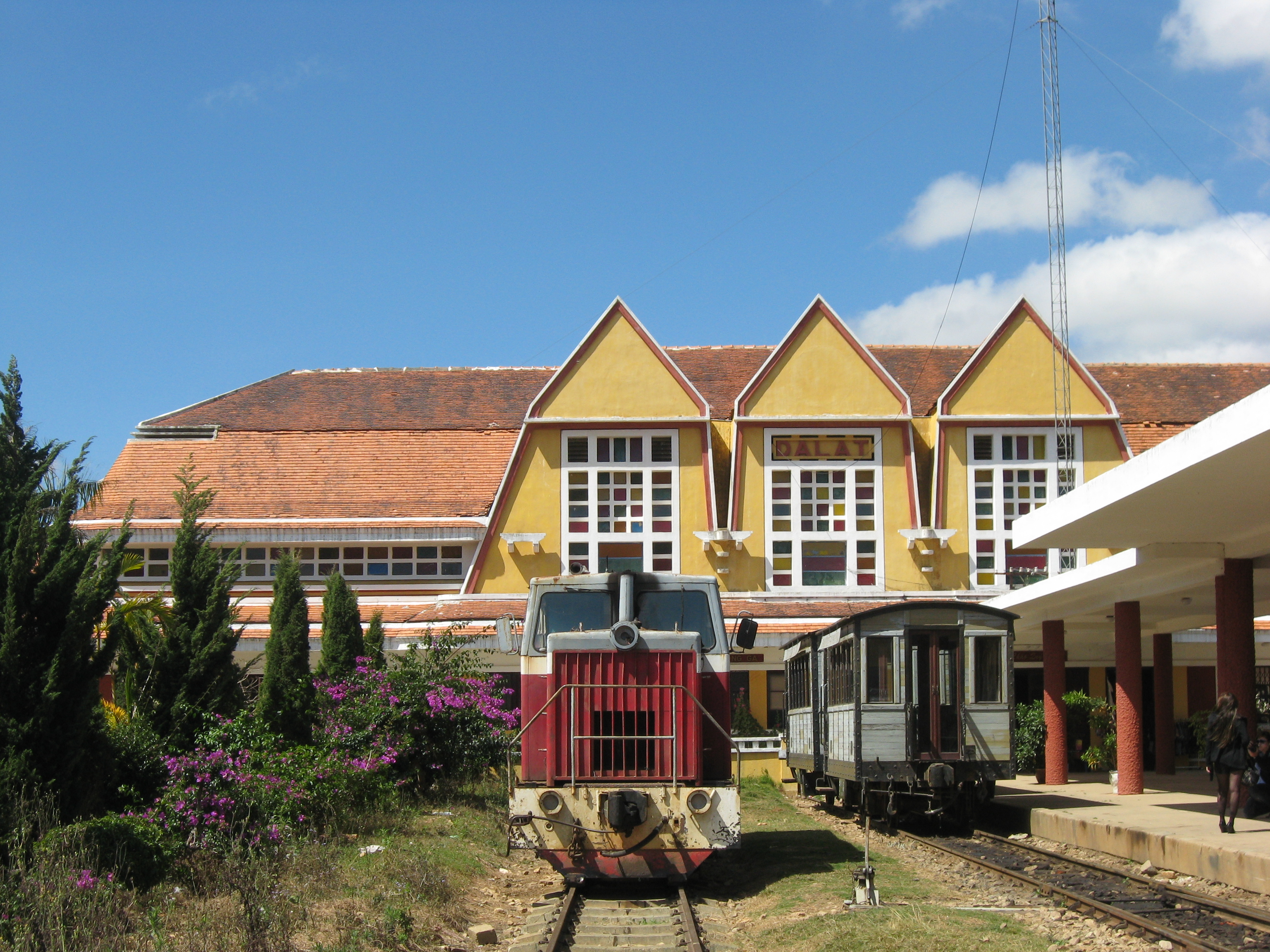
TY6P, Da Lat–Thap Cham Railway

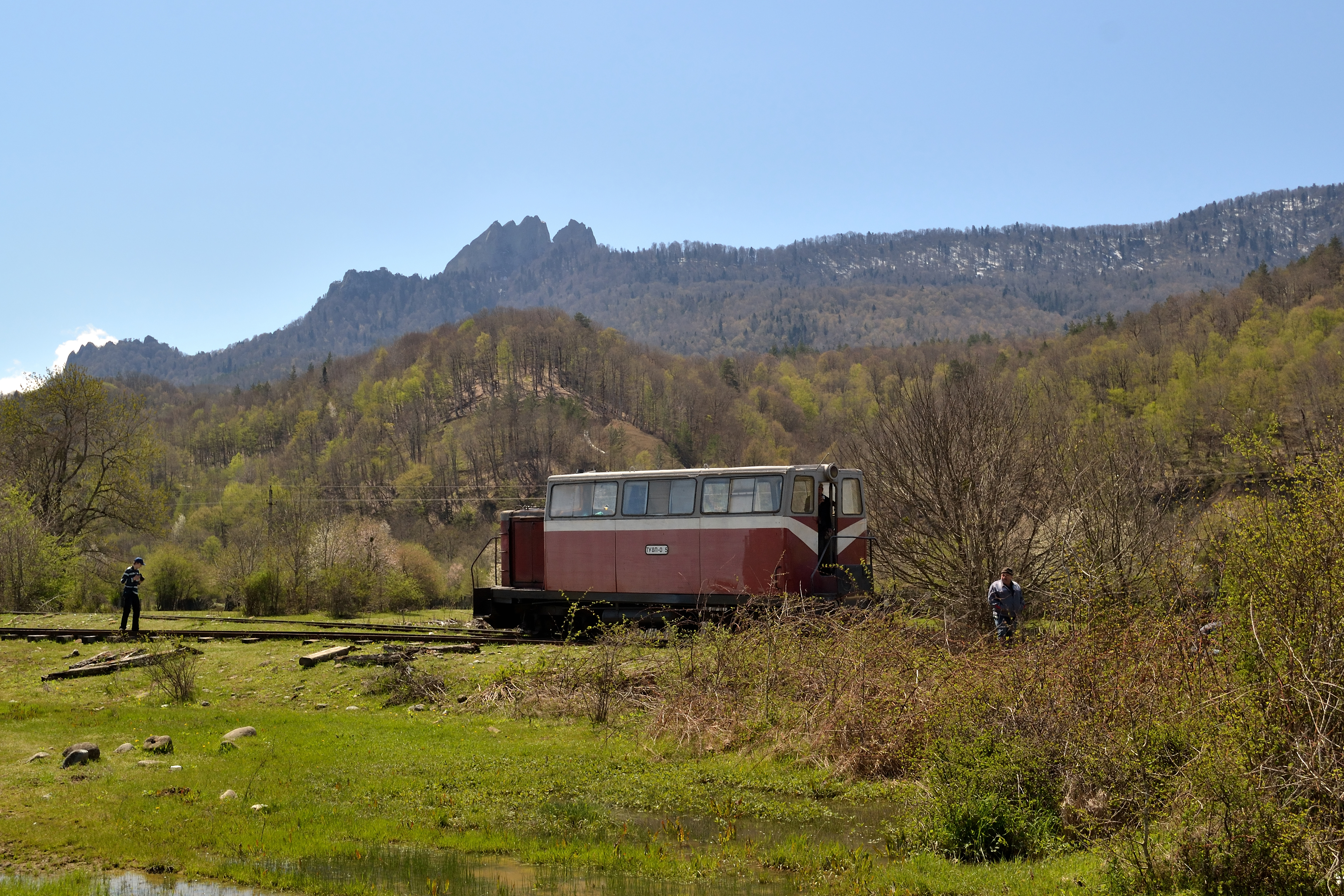
TY8P, Apsheronsk railway

== See also ==
- Narrow gauge railways
- Kambarka Engineering Works
