= Mokeiha–Zybinskoe peat railway =

Railway line in Russia

Coordinates: 57.82601°N 37.38602°E

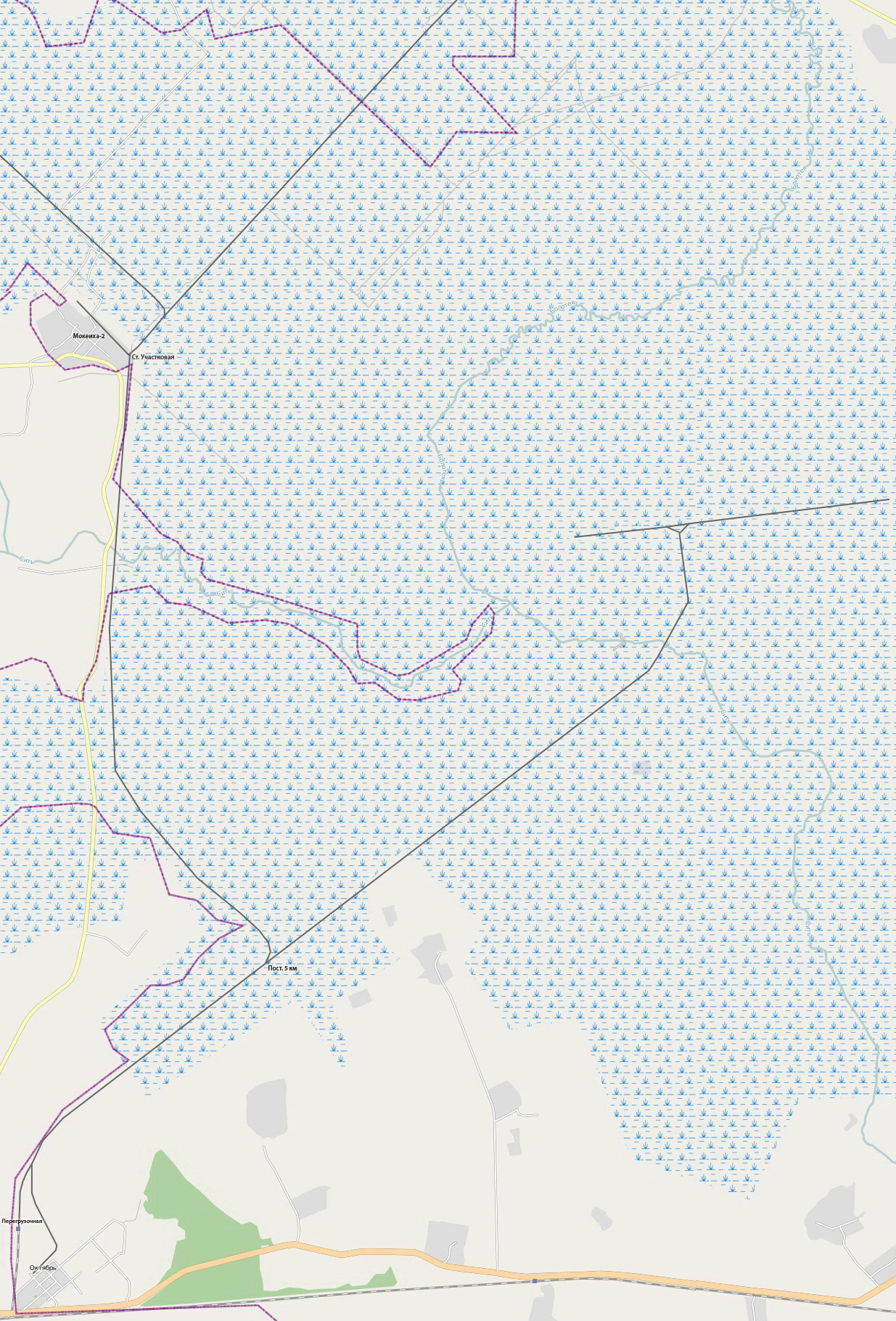

Overview
- Locale: Yaroslavl Oblast, Russia
- Termini: Oktyabr
- Website: www.mokeiha.ru

Service
- Type: Narrow-gauge railway
- Operator(s): Bioenergy (LLC Mokeiha–Zybinskoe)

History
- Opened: 1950

Technical
- Line length: 15 kilometres (9.3 mi)
- Track gauge: 750 mm (2 ft 5 1/2 in)

The Mokeiha–Zybinskoe peat railway (Russian: Узкоколейная железная дорога Мокеиха-Зыбинского торфопредприятия) is located in Yaroslavl Oblast, Russia. The peat railway was opened in 1950, and has a total length of 15 kilometres (9.3 mi) and is operational as of 2016. The track gauge is 750 mm (2 ft 5 1/2 in) and operates year-round.

== Current status ==
The Mokeiha–Zybinskoe narrow-gauge railway's first line was constructed in 1950, in the area of Nekouzsky District, Yaroslavl Oblast, from the village Oktyabr to the swamp peat fields. The peat railway was built for hauling milling peat and workers and operates year-round. The total length of the railway at the peak of its development exceeded 43 kilometres (27 mi), of which 15 kilometres (9.3 mi) is currently operational. A peat factory was opened and put into operation in 2015.

== Rolling stock ==
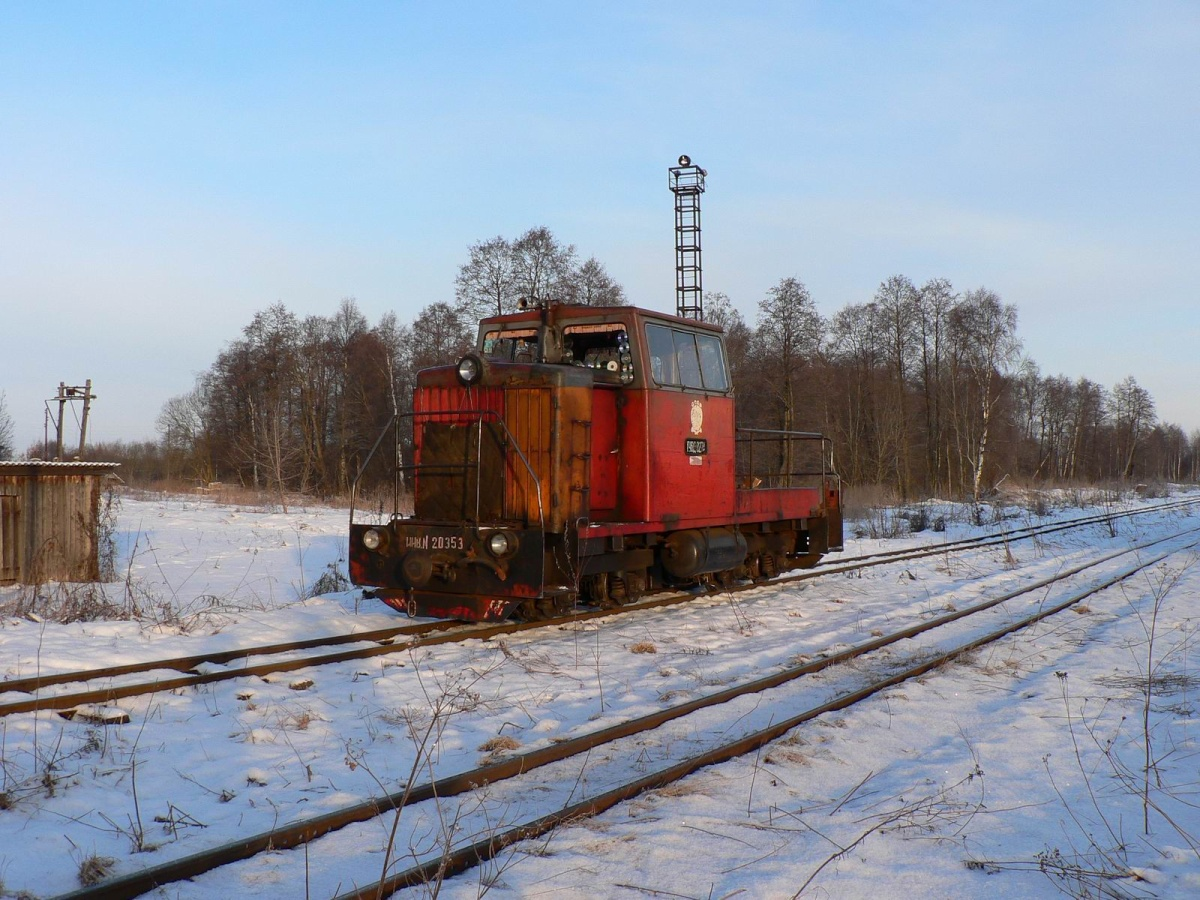
TU6D-0274

=== Locomotives ===
- TU7 – № 0727, 0904, 0952, 1677, 2908, 3333
- TU6D – № 0274
- ESU2A – № 044, 268, 929, 999
- Draisine – PD1 – № 781

=== Railway cars ===
- Flatcar
- Tank car
- Tank car – fire train
- Passenger car PV40
- Open wagon for peat TSV6A
- Hopper car to transport track ballast

=== Work trains ===
- Snowplow
- Crane KJU-O – № 8
- Track laying cranes PPR2ma

== Gallery ==
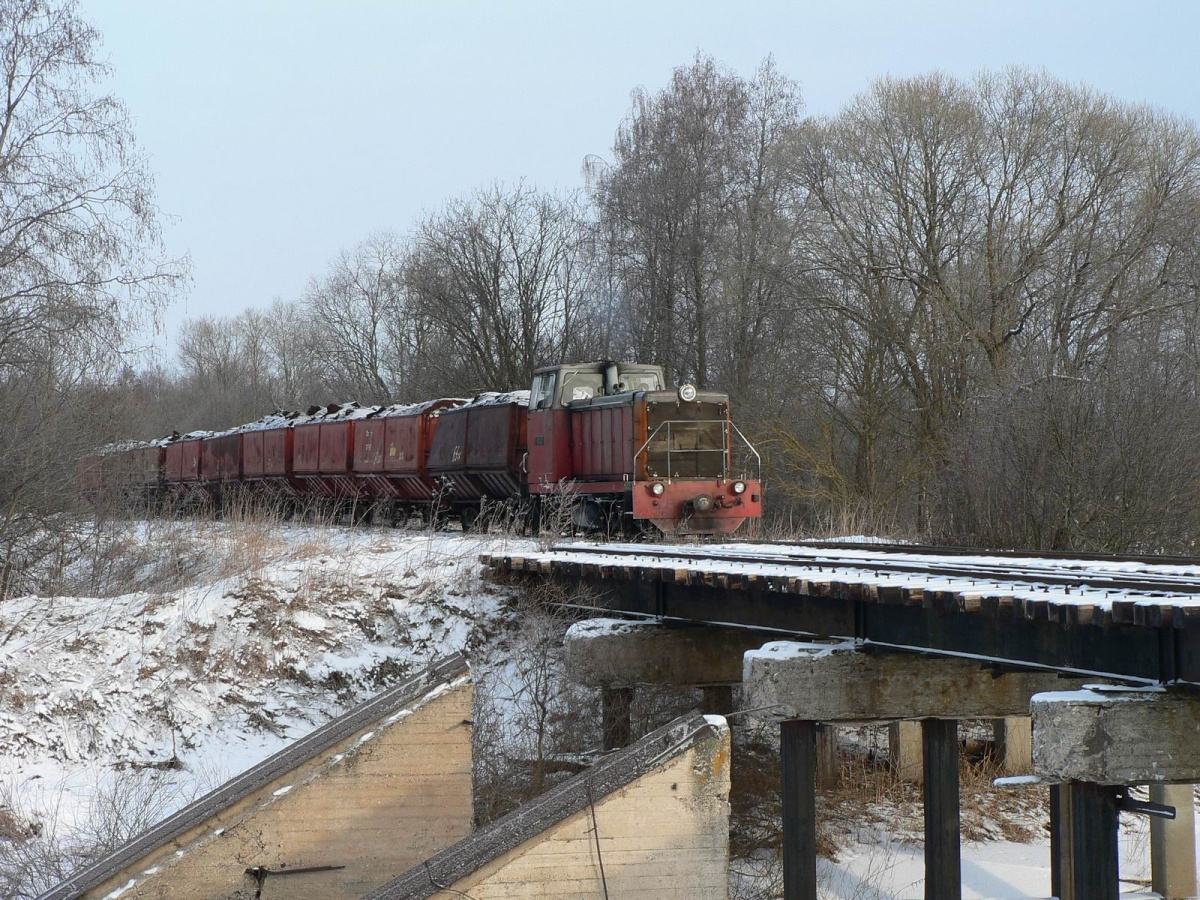
TU7A-3333 with freight train

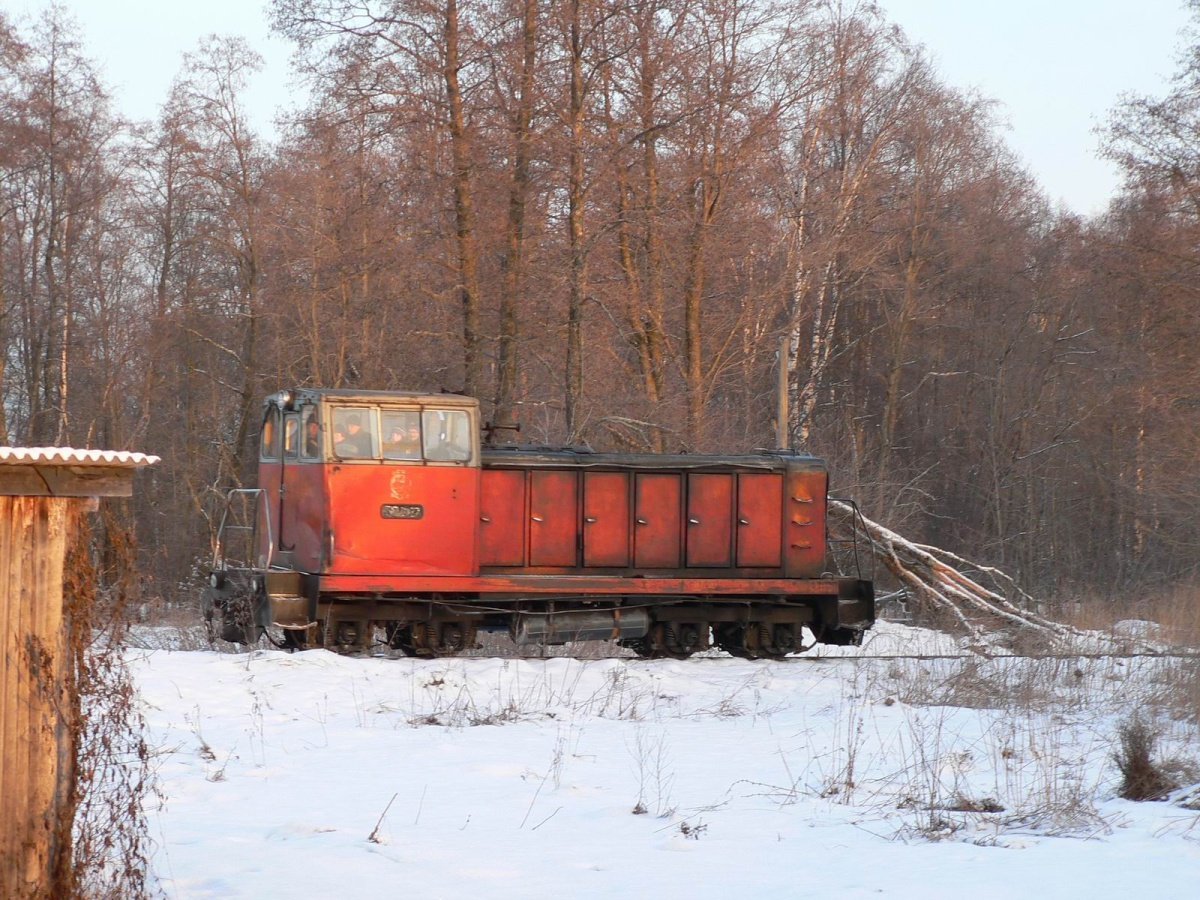
TU7-0727

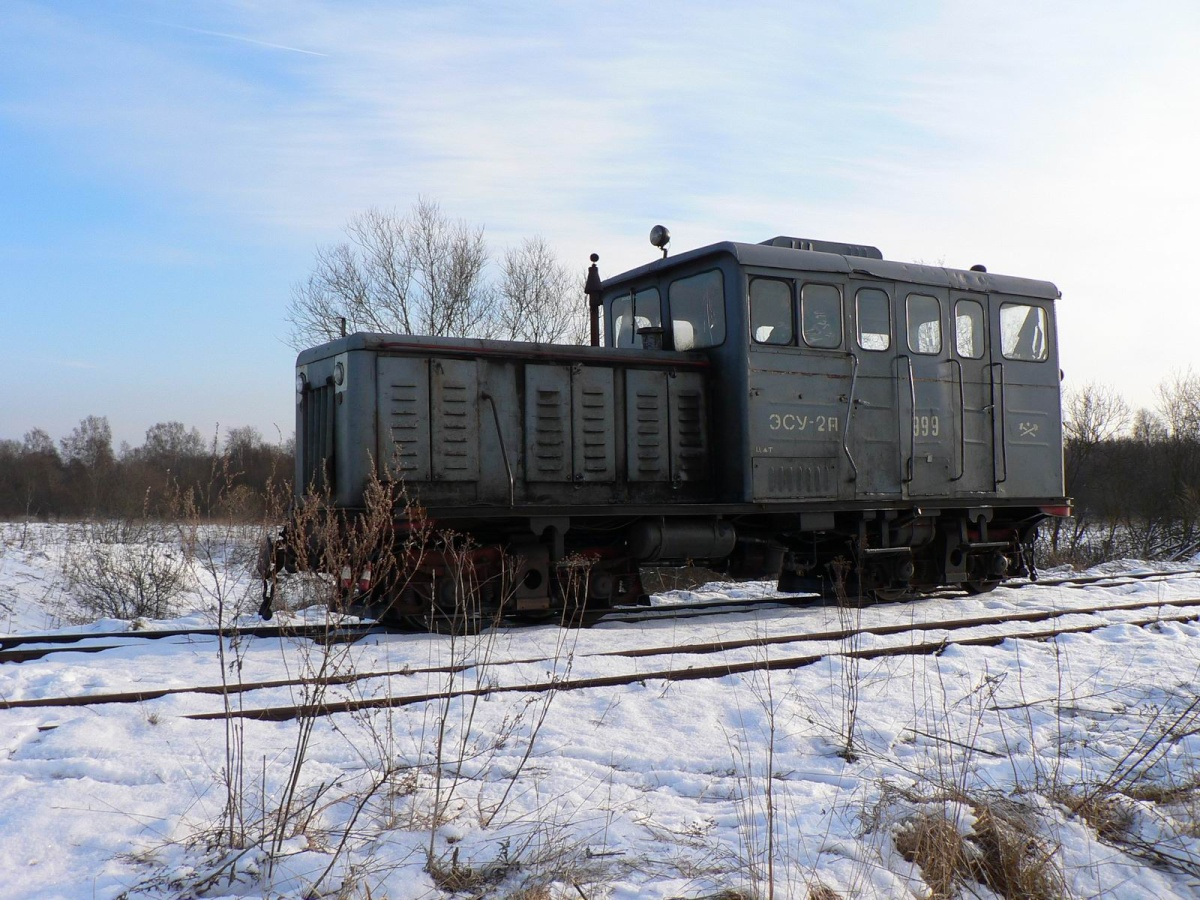
ESU2A-999

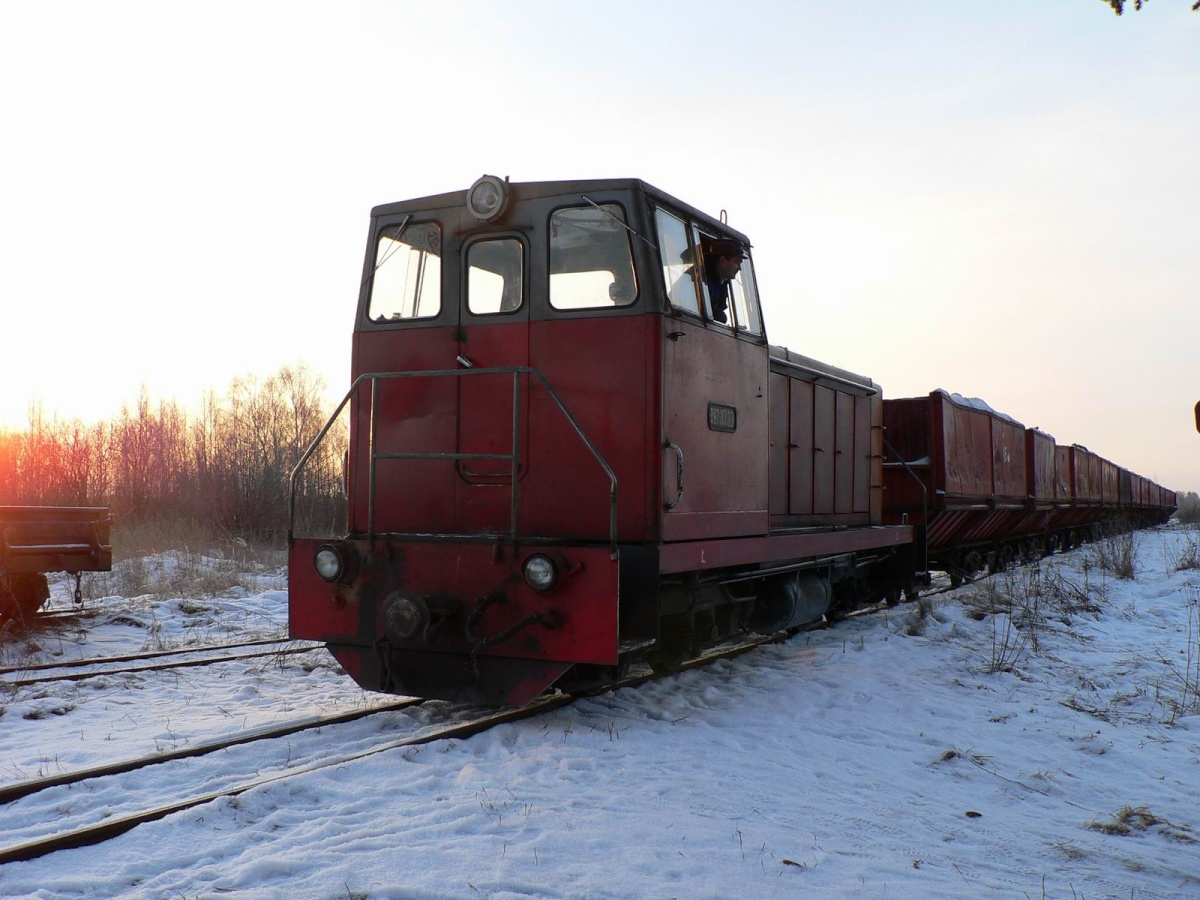
TU7A-3333 with freight train

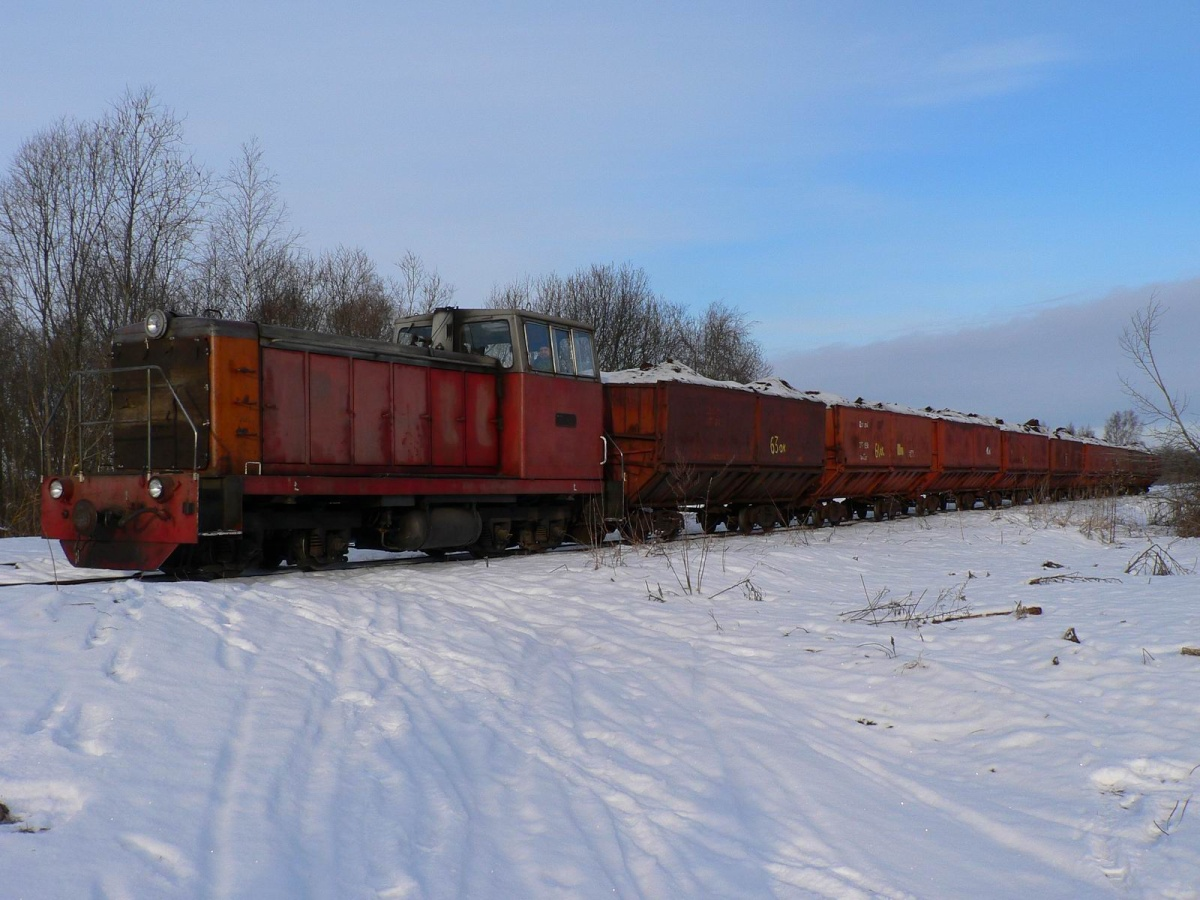
TU7A-3333 with freight train

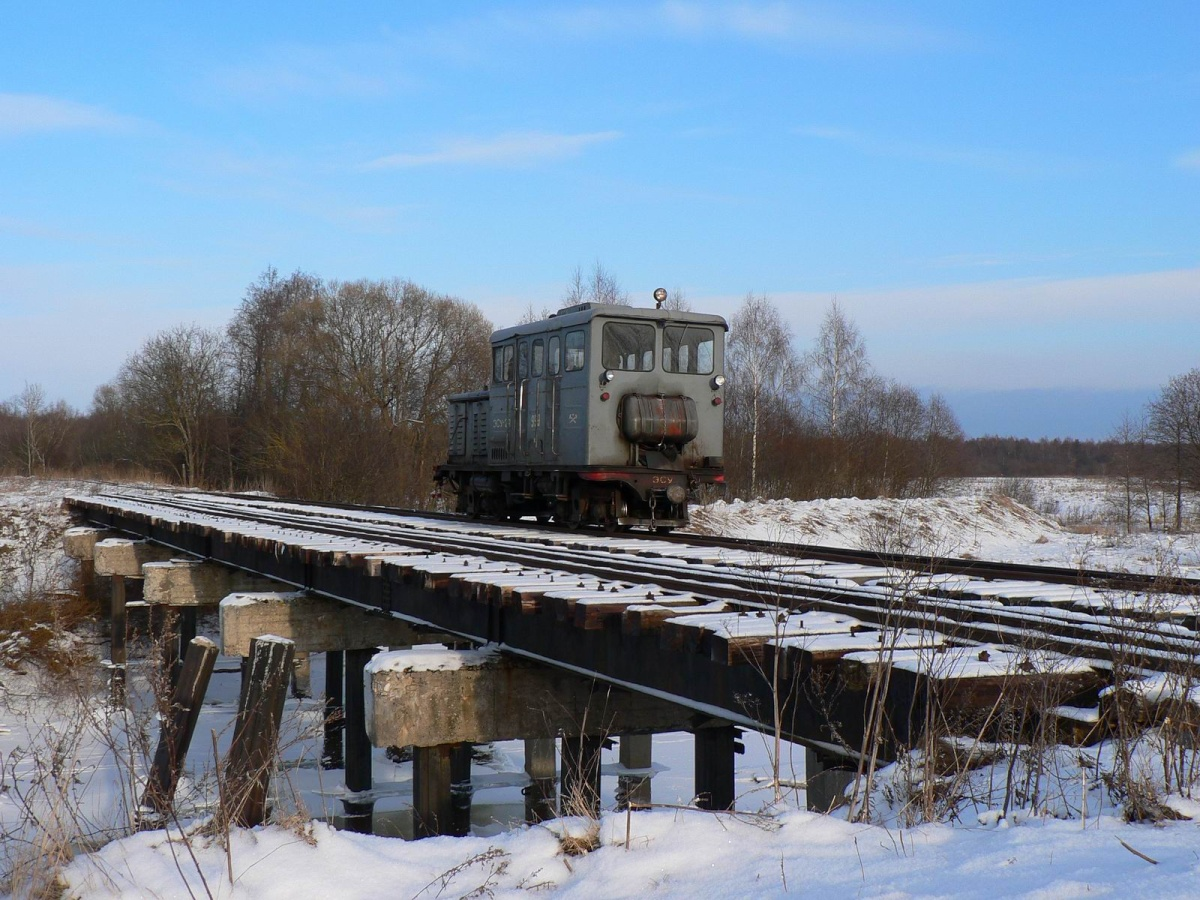
ESU2A-999

== See also ==
- LLC Bioenergy
- Narrow-gauge railways in Russia
- Gusevskoye peat railway
