= Gusevskoye peat railway =

Railway line in Russia

Coordinates: 55.48234°N 40.40992°E

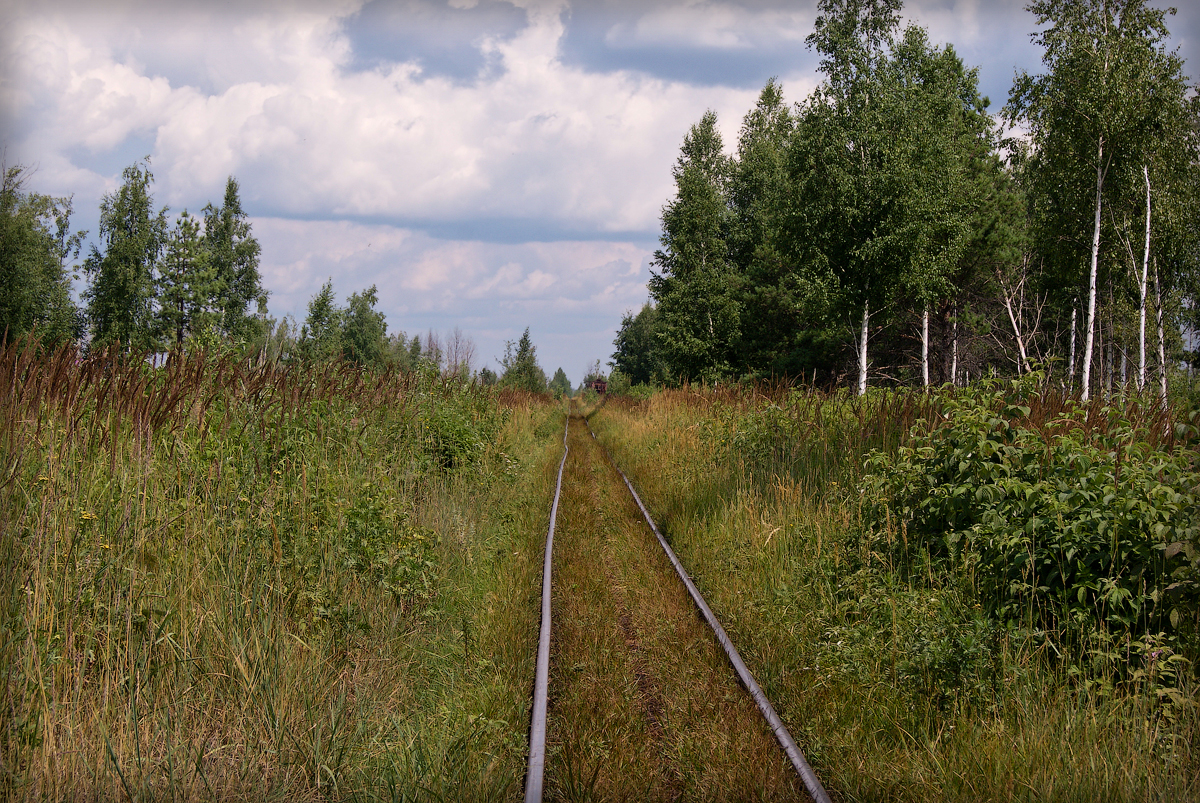

Overview
- Locale: Vladimir Oblast, Russia
- Termini: Gusevskiy; Mezinovskiy
- Website: www.mezinovka-torf33.ru

Service
- Type: Narrow-gauge railway
- Operator(s): Bioenergy (Vladimir-Peat)

History
- Opened: 1920

Technical
- Line length: 25 kilometres (16 mi)
- Track gauge: 750 mm (2 ft 5 1/2 in)
Route map
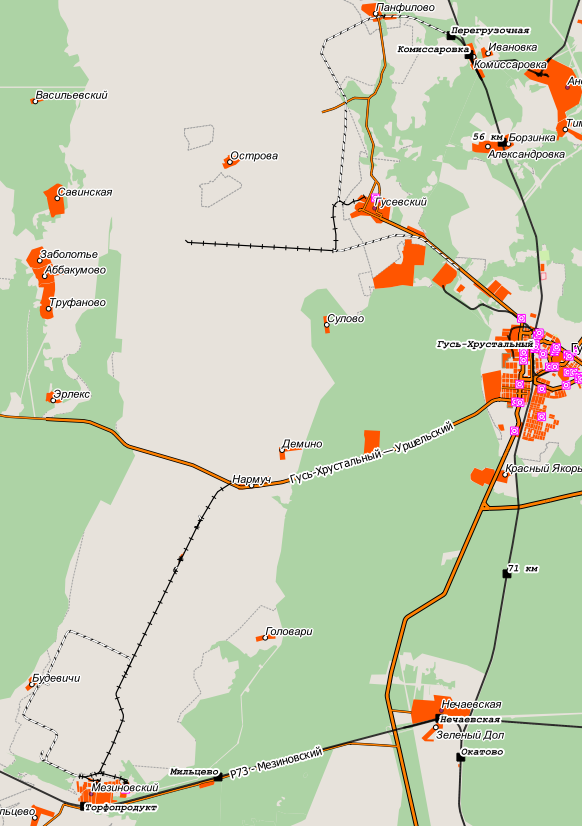

The Gusevskoye peat railway is located in Vladimir Oblast, Russia. The peat railway was opened in 1920, and has a total length of which 25 kilometres (16 mi) is currently operational; the track gauge is 750 mm (2 ft 5 1/2 in).

== History ==
Gusevskoye peat railway emerged in the 1920s, in the area Gus-Khrustalny District, in a settlement named Gus-Khrustalny in 1931 became a town. The railway had a maximum length of about 100 kilometres (62 mi) at its peak. Gusevskoye railway was built for hauling peat and workers and operates year-round with several pairs of trains a day. At present only 25 kilometres (16 mi) of the railway is operational, current operations include passenger traffic (workers-tourists) and freight traffic, transportation of peat. A peat briquette factory was built and put into operation in 2010 in a settlement named Gusevskiy. A peat briquette factory was built and put into operation in 2011 in a settlement named Mezinovskiy. About 2011 half of the railroad was dismantled. Formed two separate railway network.

== Current status ==
There was two separated railways, operated by different companies.

- Guseevskiy – westbound.
- Mezinovskiy – northbound.

Transportation of peat to the briquette factory is ongoing.

== Rolling stock ==
=== Locomotives ===
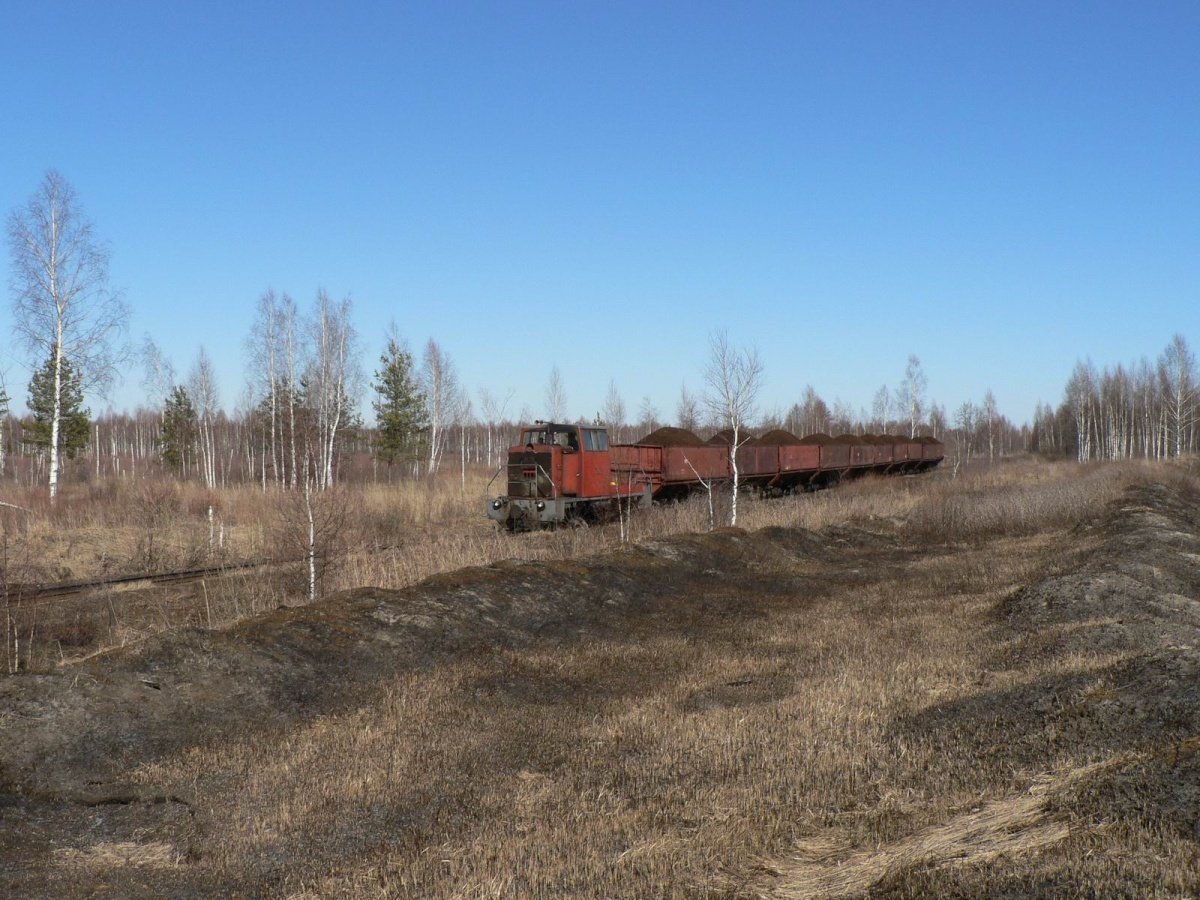
TU6D-0202 with freight train

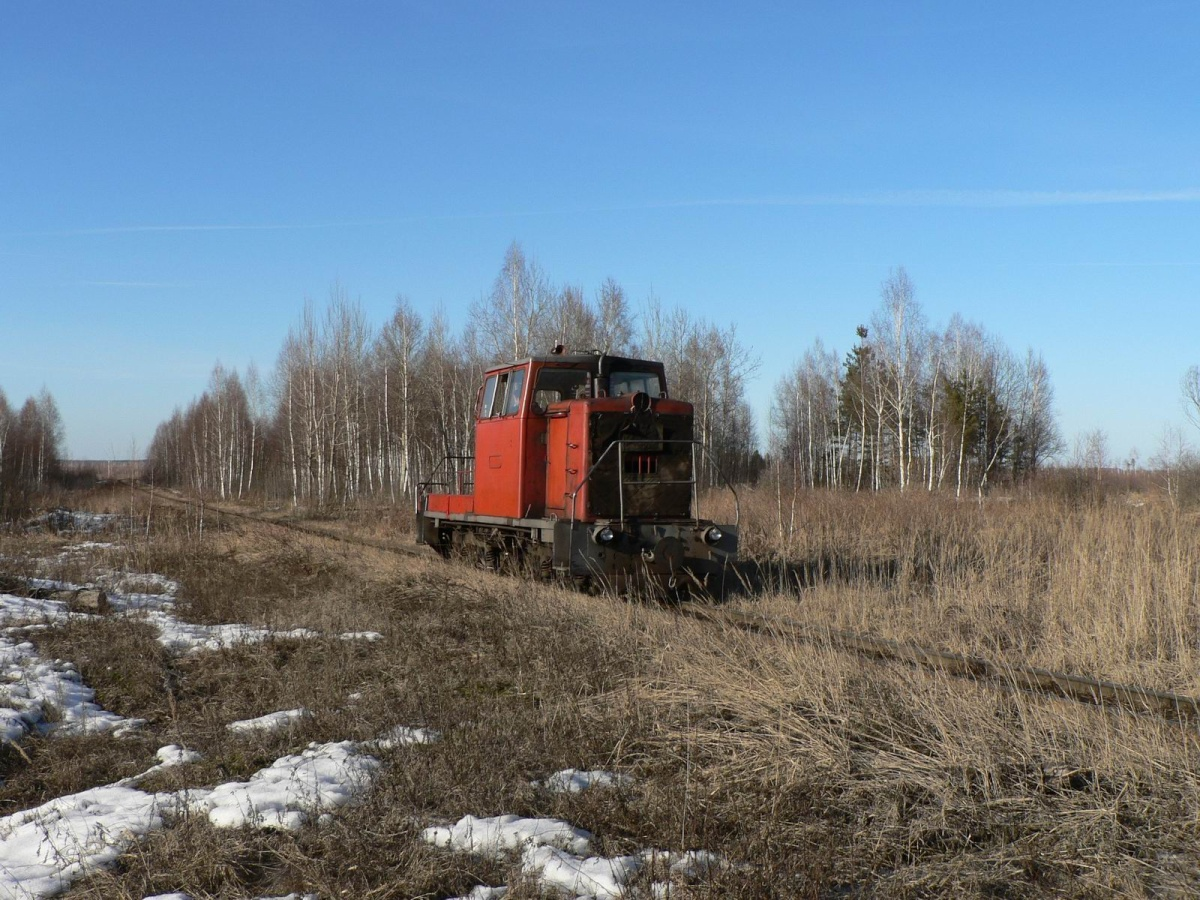
TU6D-0202

Locomotive Depot – Mezinovskoye:

- TU7 – № 2999, 3310, 2087, 3028, 3311
- TU6D – № 0023
- TU6A – № 1663
- ESU2A – № 249, 721, 997, 994
- ESU1 – № 277 (Snow blower)
- TD-5U Pioneer
- GMD4 rail lorry (to the museum in 2013)

Engine Shed - Gusevskoye:

- TU4 – № 2303, 1547
- ESU2A – № 1024, 987
- Draisine - PD1 – № 764

=== Railroad car ===
- Flatcar
- Tank car
- Snowplow
- Tank car - fire train
- Passenger car
- Side-tipping wagons
- Open wagon for peat
- Hopper car to transport track ballast

=== Work trains ===
- Crane GK-5
- Track laying cranes PPR2ma

== Gallery ==
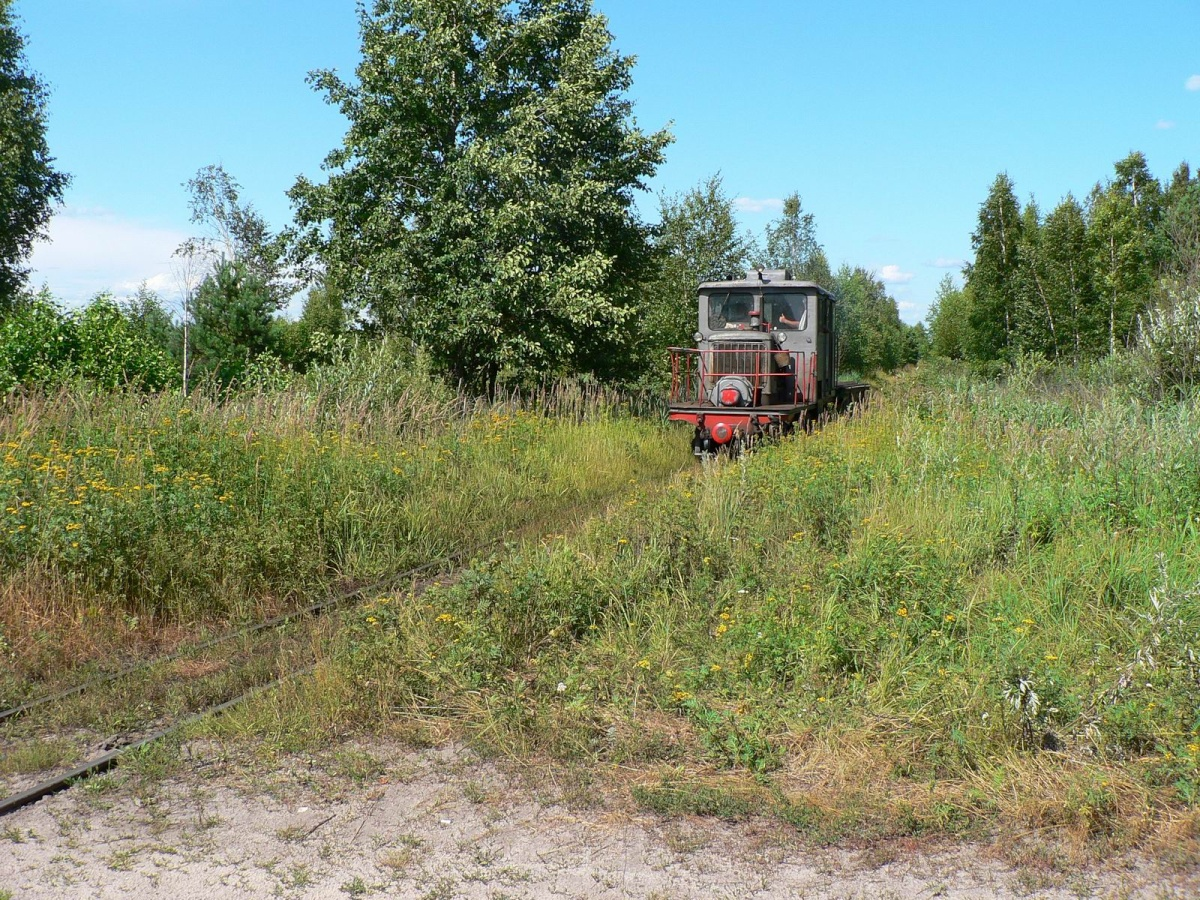
Locomotive ESU2A-994

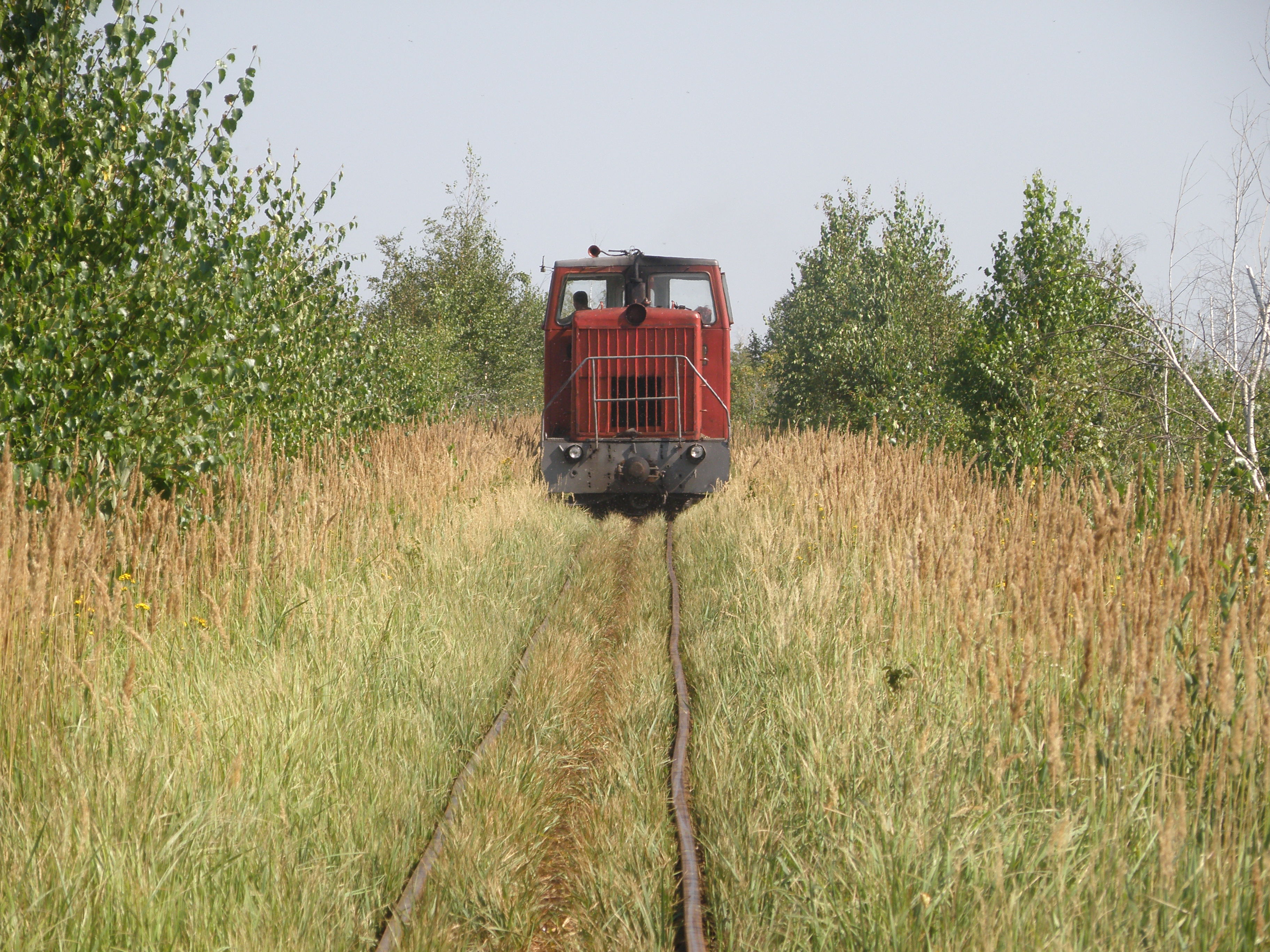
Locomotive TU6D-0202

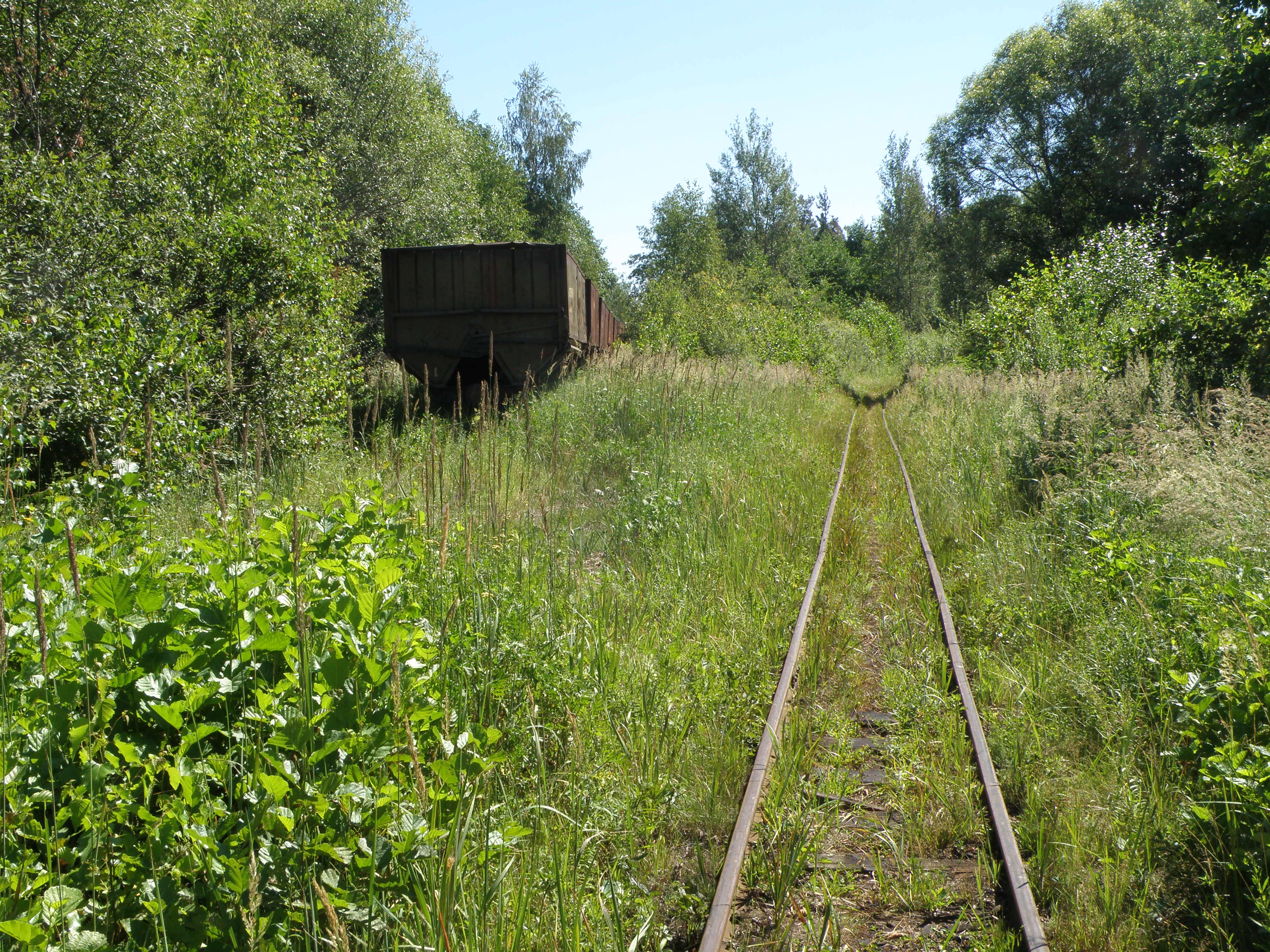
Open wagons TSV-6a for peat

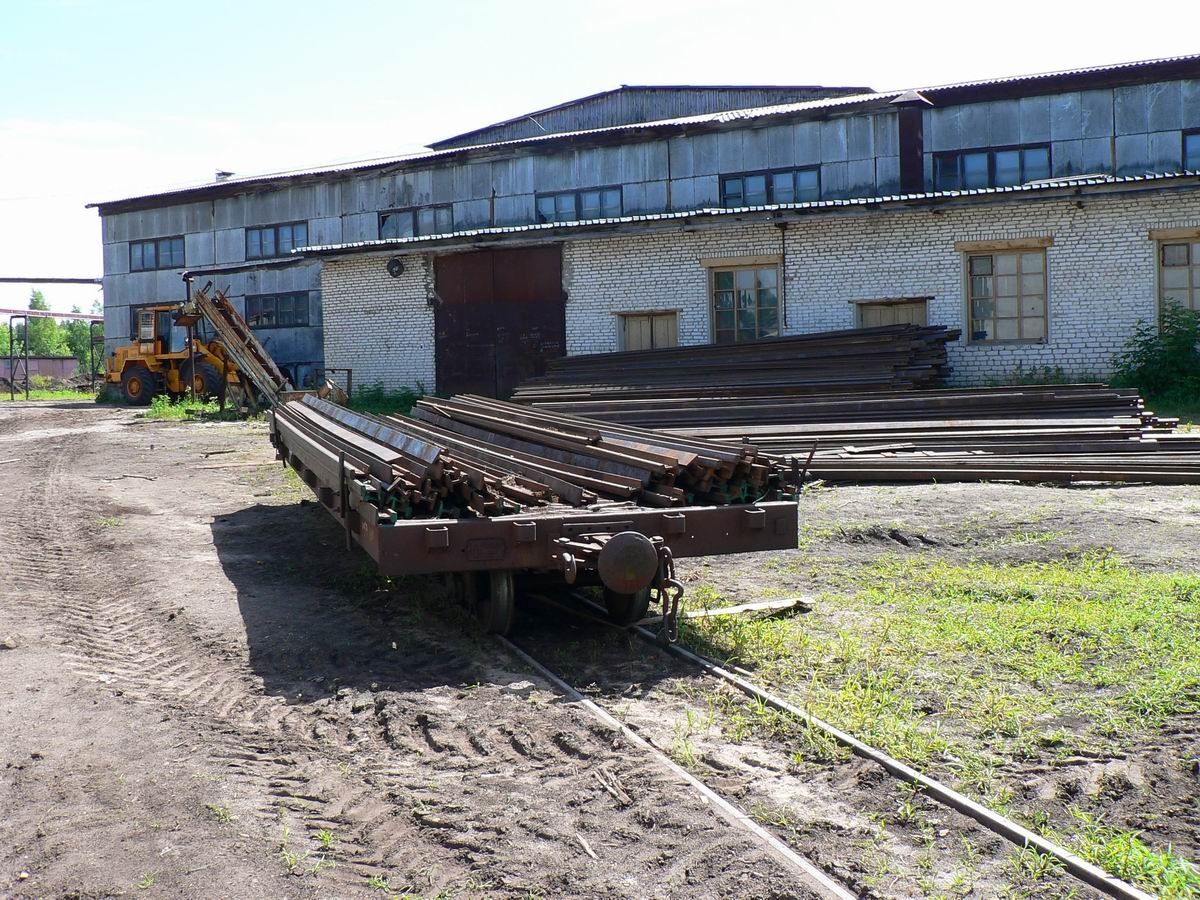
Mezinovskoye

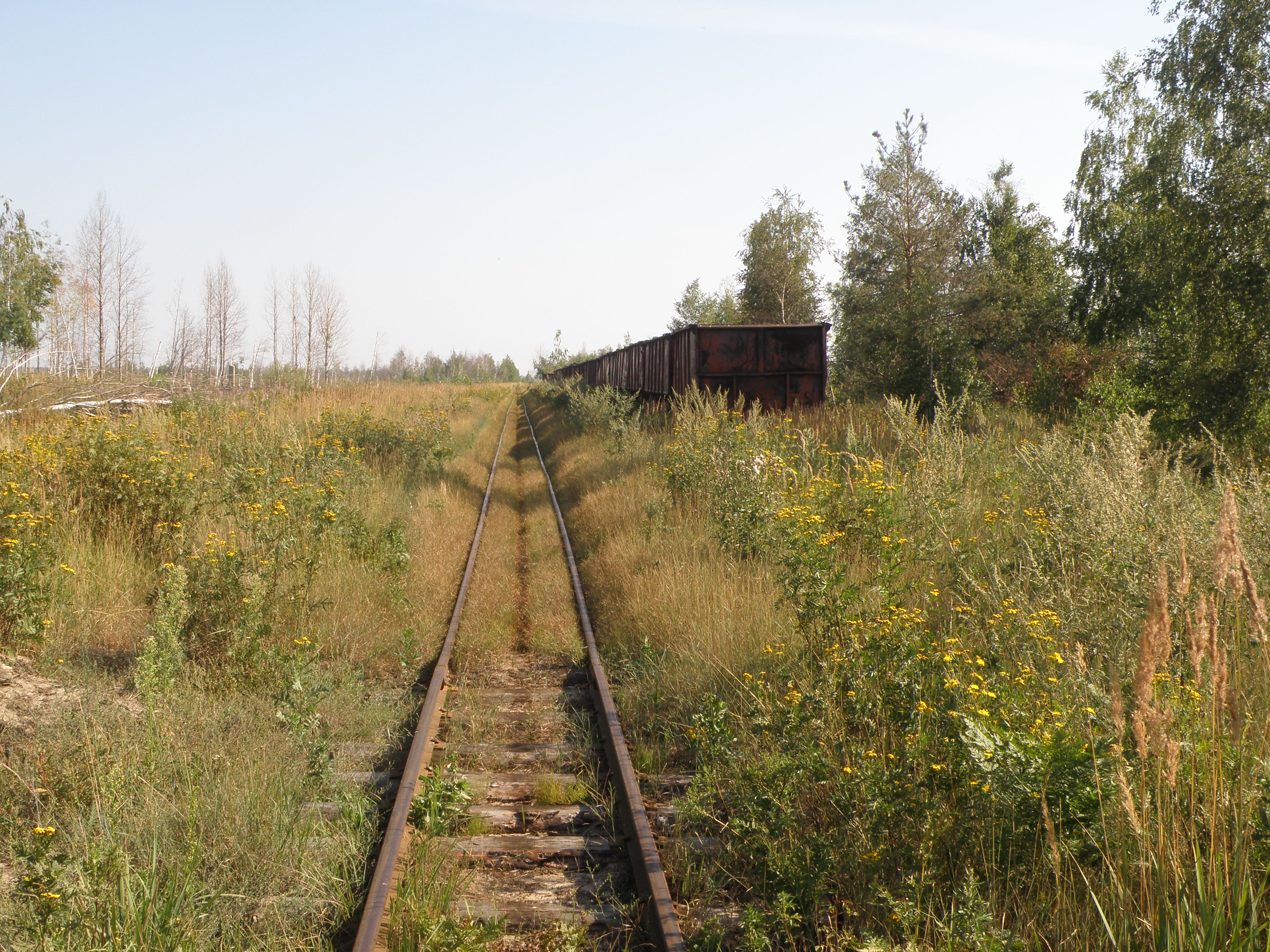
Station

== See also ==
- Bioenergy
- Narrow-gauge railways in Russia
- Mokeiha-Zybinskoe peat railway
