= Bioenergy Corporation =

Industrial holding company

LLC Bioenergy
- Company type: LLC
- Industry: Peat industry
- Founded: 2011
- Headquarters: Russia
- Area served: Russia
- Key people: David Yakobashvili; Yan Yanovskiy
- Products: Peat, biofuels, fertilizers
- Website: bioenco.ru

Bioenergy Corporation (Russian: Корпорация "Биоэнергия") is industrial holding company in the field of fuel energy, engineering and biotechnology. Assets of the company provide a production cycle for Industrial Engineering, peat extraction and processing, production and distribution of finished products, generating heat and electricity.

The basis for holding a number of technology clusters in the peat industry. The main production assets are concentrated in the Central European part of Russia. In particular, a corporation controlled by one of the largest peat Russian companies LLC "Mokeiha-Zybinskoe" in the Yaroslavl region of Russia and "Vladimir-Peat" in Vladimir region.

== Gallery ==
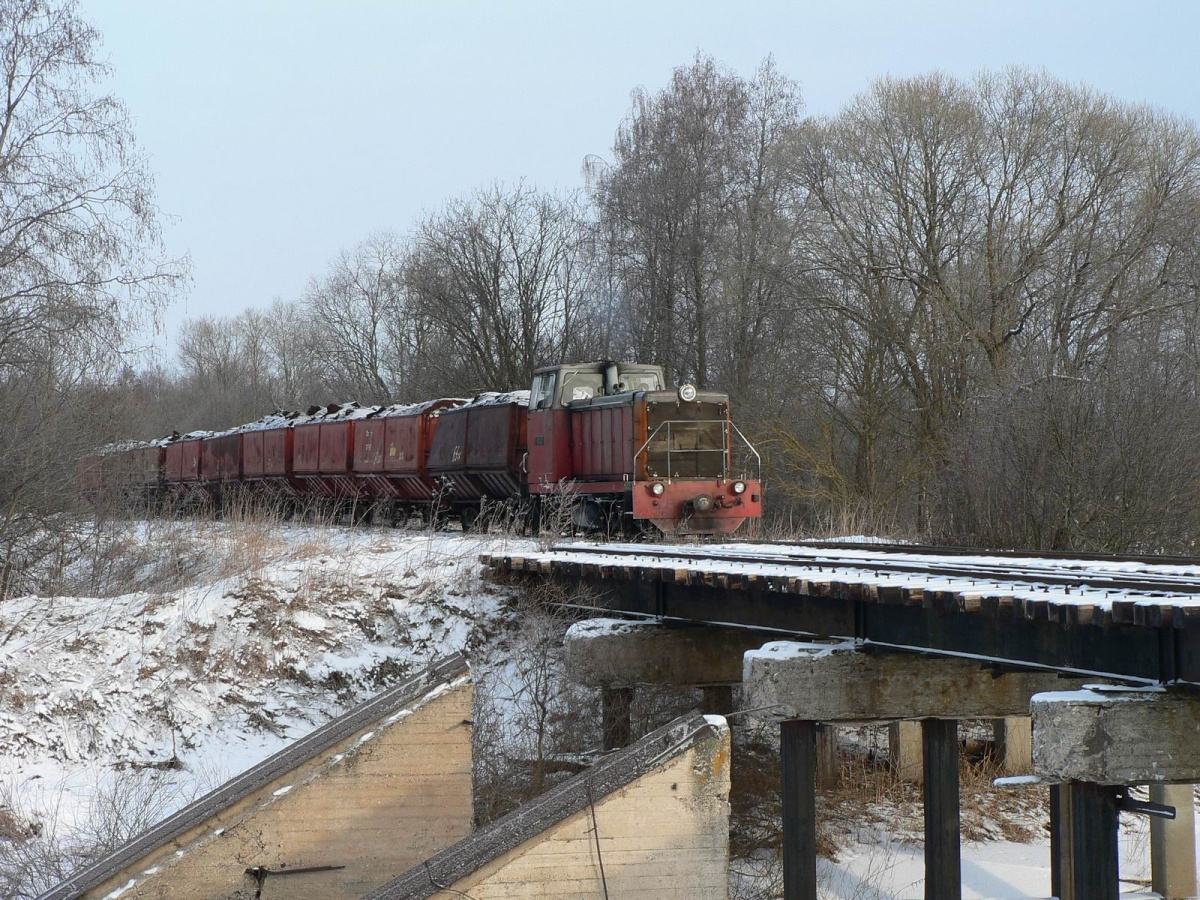
LLC Mokeiha-Zybinskoe

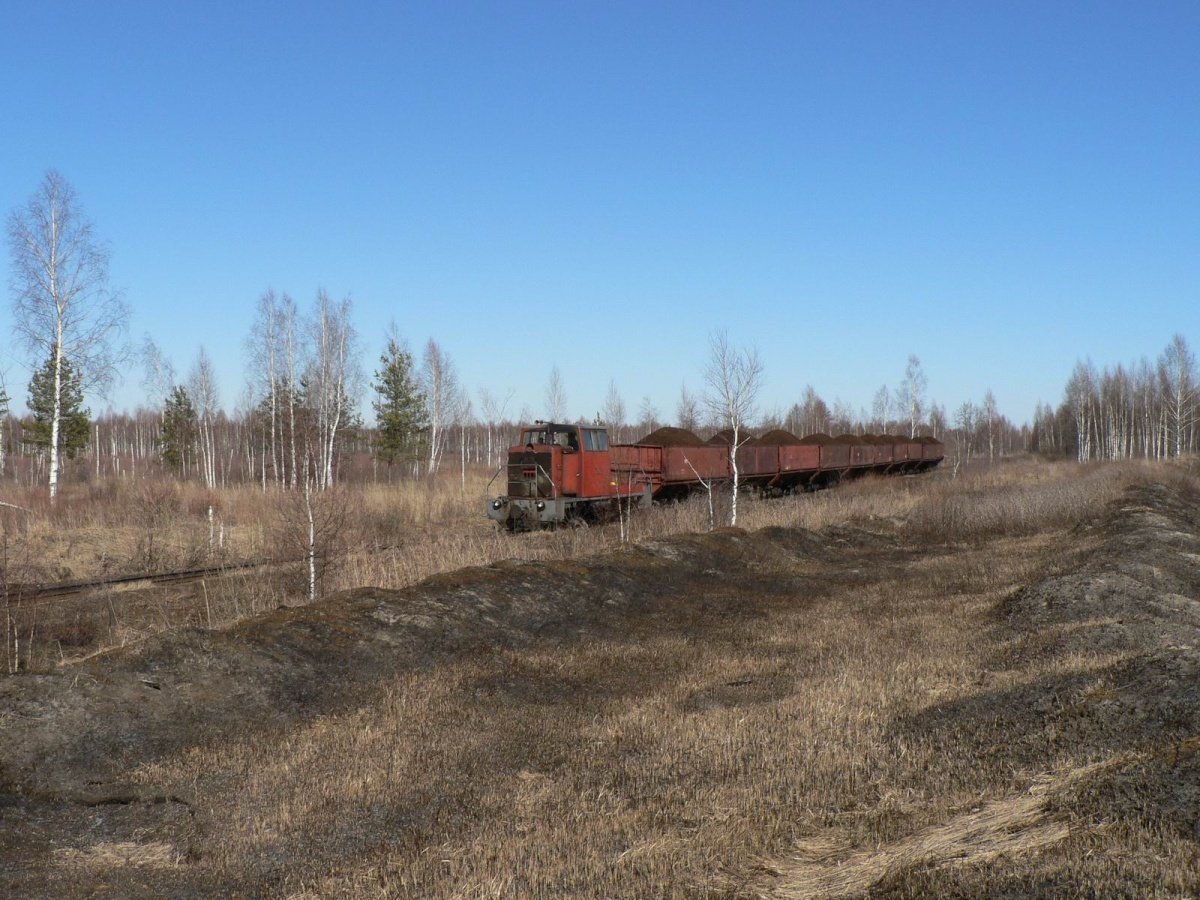
Vladimir-Peat

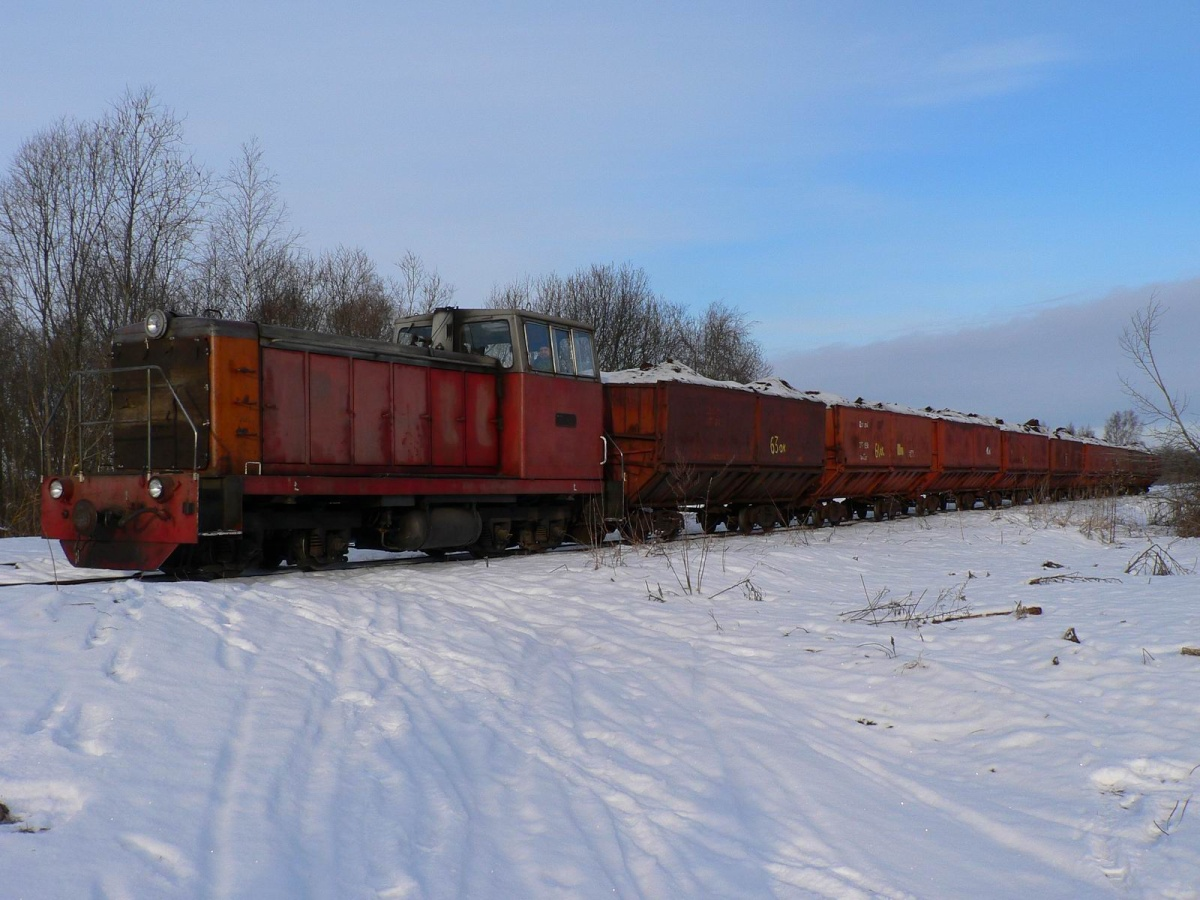
LLC Mokeiha-Zybinskoe

== Management ==
- Chairman of the board of directors is David Yakobashvili.
- President, Member of the Board is Yan Yanovskiy.
