= Abramovo =

Abramovo (Russian: Абрамово) is the name of several rural localities in Russia:

- Abramovo, Arzamassky District, Nizhny Novgorod Oblast, a selo in Arzamassky District of Nizhny Novgorod Oblast
- Abramovo, Dorogobuzhsky District, Smolensk Oblast, a village in Mikhailovskoye Settlement of Dorogobuzhsky District of Smolensk Oblast; 54°54′39″N 33°34′24″E
- Abramovo, Krasnooktyabrsky District, Nizhny Novgorod Oblast, a village in Krasnooktyabrsky District of Nizhny Novgorod Oblast
- Abramovo, Leningrad Oblast, a village in Tikhvinsky District of Leningrad Oblast
- Abramovo, Moscow Oblast, a village in Sergiyevo-Posadsky District of Moscow Oblast
- Abramovo, Novosibirsk Oblast, a selo in Kuybyshevsky District, Novosibirsk Oblast
- Abramovo, Perm Krai, a village in Kosinsky District of Perm Krai
- Abramovo, Rudnyansky District, Smolensk Oblast, a village in Ponizovsky Settlement of Rudnyansky District of Smolensk Oblast; 55°17′03″N 31°08′27″E
- Abramovo, Sverdlovsk Oblast, a selo in Sysertsky District of Sverdlovsk Oblast
- Abramovo, Tyomkinsky District, Smolensk Oblast, a village in Medvedevskoye Settlement of Tyomkinsky District of Smolensk Oblast; 54°58′06″N 34°50′32″E
- Abramovo, Vladimir Oblast, a village in Melenkovsky District of the Vladimir Oblast
- Abramovo, Vologda Oblast, a village in of Vologodsky District of Vologda Oblast
