= Tonshayevsky District =

Tonshayevsky District Тоншаевский район (Russian)
- District
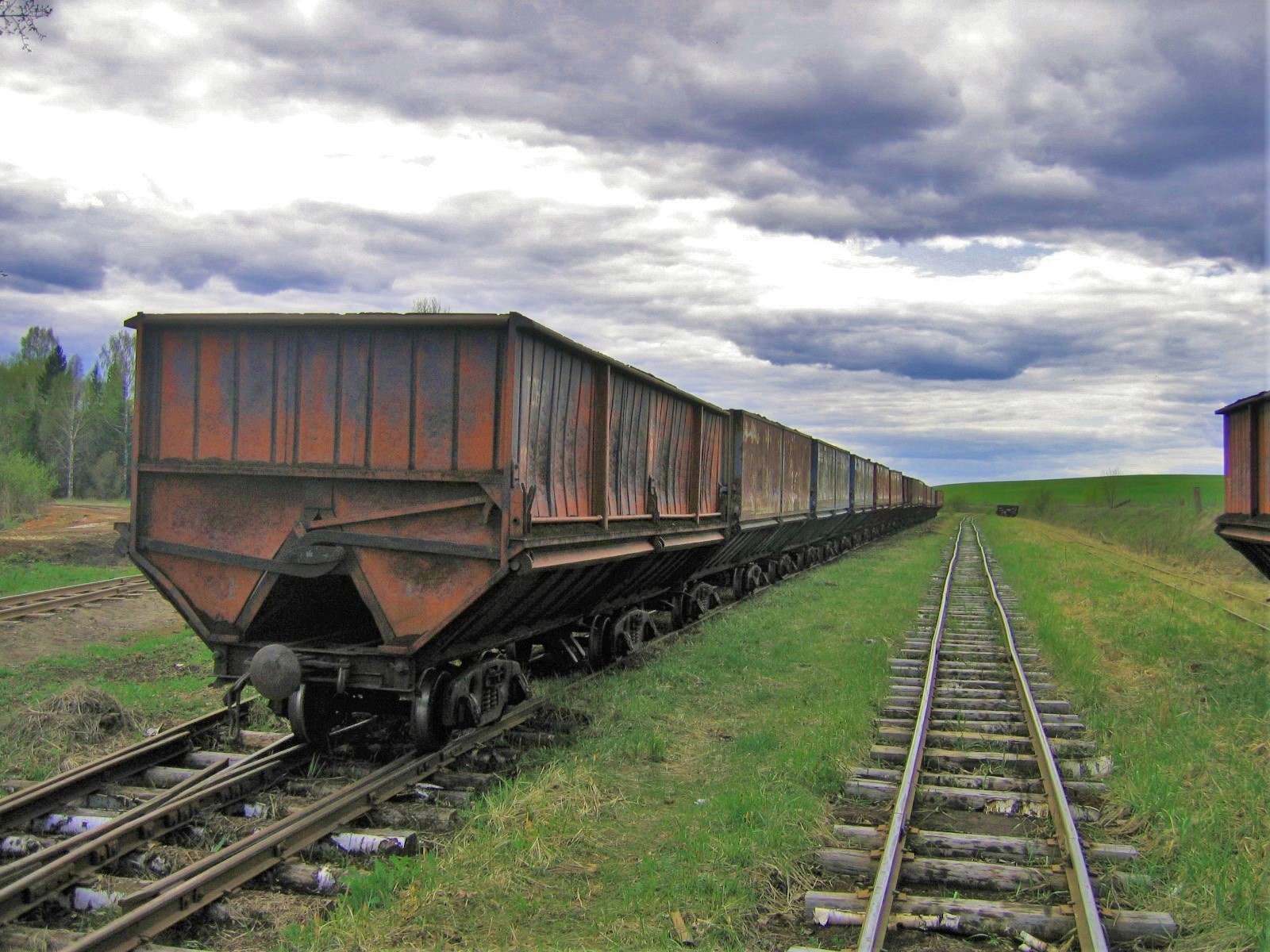
- Altsevo peat narrow gauge railway in Tonshayevsky District

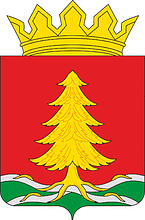
- Flag Coat of arms
- Location of Tonshayevsky District in Nizhny Novgorod Oblast
- Coordinates: 57°44′19″N 47°01′05″E
- Country: Russia
- Federal subject: Nizhny Novgorod Oblast
- Established: 1929
- Administrative center: Tonshayevo

Area
  - Total: 2,353.1 km^{2} (908.5 sq mi)

Population (2010 Census)
  - Total: 20,219
  - Density: 8.5925/km^{2} (22.254/sq mi)
  - Urban: 48.9%
  - Rural: 51.1%

Administrative structure
  - Administrative divisions: 3 Work settlements, 6 Selsoviets
  - Inhabited localities: 3 urban-type settlements, 77 rural localities

Municipal structure
  - Municipally incorporated as: Tonshayevsky Municipal District
  - Municipal divisions: 3 urban settlements, 6 rural settlements
- Time zone: UTC+3 (MSK)
- OKTMO ID: 22653000
- Website: http://tns.omsu-nnov.ru

Tonshayevsky District (Russian: Тонша́евский райо́н) is an administrative district (raion), one of the forty in Nizhny Novgorod Oblast, Russia. Municipally, it is incorporated as Tonshayevsky Municipal District. It is located in the northeast of the oblast. The area of the district is 2,353.1 square kilometers (908.5 sq mi). Its administrative center is the urban locality (a work settlement) of Tonshayevo. Population: 20,219 (2010 Census); 20,038 (2002 census); 19,588 (1989 Soviet census). The population of Tonshayevo accounts for 22.6% of the district's total population.

== History ==
The district was established in 1929.

== Transportation ==
The Altsevo peat narrow gauge railway is located in the work settlement of Pizhma, closed in 2015.
The Pizhemskaya narrow gauge railway is located in the work settlement of Pizhma.
