= Abramovo, Arzamassky District, Nizhny Novgorod Oblast =

Abramovo Абрамово
- Selo
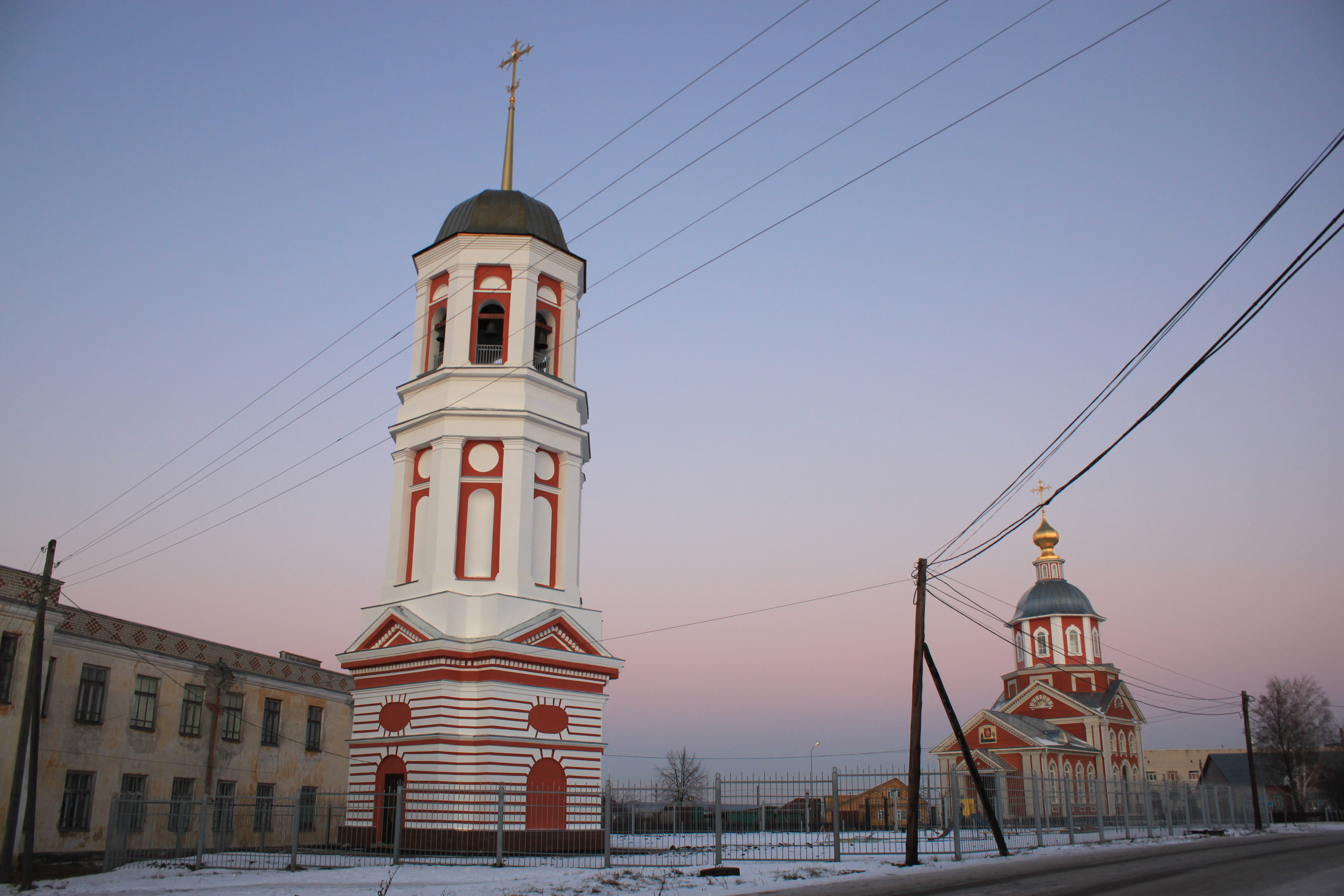

- Location within Nizhny Novgorod Oblast Location within Russia
- Coordinates: 55°24′N 43°39′E
- Country: Russia
- Region: Nizhny Novgorod Oblast
- District: Arzamassky District
- Time zone: UTC+3:00

Abramovo (Russian: Абра́мово) is a rural locality (a selo) and the administrative center of Abramovsky Selsoviet of Arzamassky District, Nizhny Novgorod Oblast, Russia. The population was 1,383 as of 2010. There are 16 streets.

== Geography ==
Abramovo is located 12 km west of Arzamas (the district's administrative centre) by road. Merlino is the nearest rural locality.
