= Tonshayevo =

Tonshayevo Тоншаево
- Urban-type settlement
- Interactive map of Tonshayevo
- Location of Tonshayevo Tonshayevo (Nizhny Novgorod Oblast)
- Coordinates: 57.7332°N 47.0127°E
- Country: Russia
- Federal subject: Nizhny Novgorod Oblast
- Administrative district: Tonshayevsky District
- Founded: 1811

Population (2010 Census)
  - Total: 4,570
  - Estimate (2025): 4,430 (−3.1%)
- Time zone: UTC+3 (MSK)
- Postal code: 606950
- OKTMO ID: 22653151051

Tonshayevo (Russian: Тонша́ево; Mari: Пижымбал, Pižymbal, alternatively Туҥышо, Tuňyšo) is an urban locality (an urban-type settlement) in Tonshayevsky District of Nizhny Novgorod Oblast, Russia. Population: 4,570 (2010 census); 4,432 (2002 census); 4,394 (1989 Soviet census).
