= Rudnyansky =

Rudnyansky (masculine), Rudnyanskaya (feminine), or Rudnyanskoye (neuter) may refer to:

- Rudnyansky District, several districts in Russia
- Rudnyanskoye Urban Settlement, several municipal urban settlements in Russia
