= Kerzhenets peat railway =

Railway line in Russia

Coordinates: 56.473679°N 44.424574°E

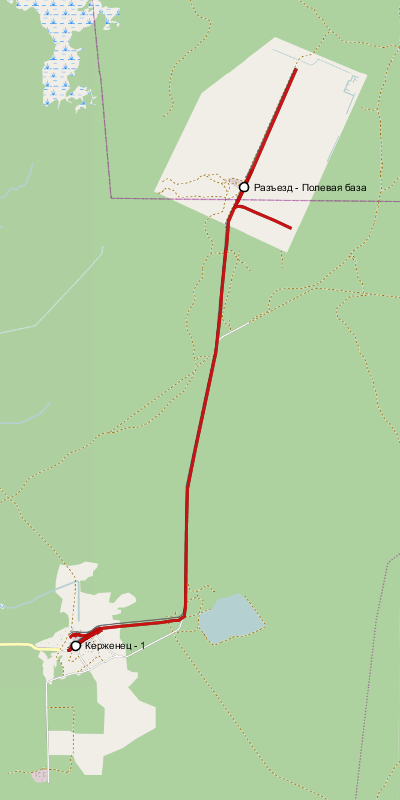

Overview
- Locale: Nizhny Novgorod Oblast, Russia
- Termini: Kerzhenets

Service
- Type: Narrow gauge railway
- Operator(s): ОАО «Борресурсы»

History
- Opened: 1945

Technical
- Line length: 14 kilometres (8.7 mi)
- Track gauge: 750 mm (2 ft 5 1/2 in)

The Kerzhenets peat railway is located in Nizhny Novgorod Oblast, Russia. The peat railway was opened in 1945, and has a total length of 14 kilometres (8.7 mi); the track gauge is 750 mm (2 ft 5 1/2 in). The railway operates year-round.

== Current status ==
The Kerzhenets peat railway emerged in the 1940s, in the area of Borsky District, Nizhny Novgorod Oblast. The peat railway was built for hauling peat and workers. The railway line leaves Kerzhenets at northern side to reach the peat fields. Until 1997 the settlement Pionersky at Kerzhenets River was the terminus of the railway. A peat briquette factory was established in 2002 and started its work in 2004.

== Rolling stock ==
=== Locomotives ===
- TU8 – №0307
- ESU2A – №925

=== Railroad car ===
- Flatcar
- Tank car
- Snow blower
- Crane (railroad)
- Open wagon

== Gallery ==
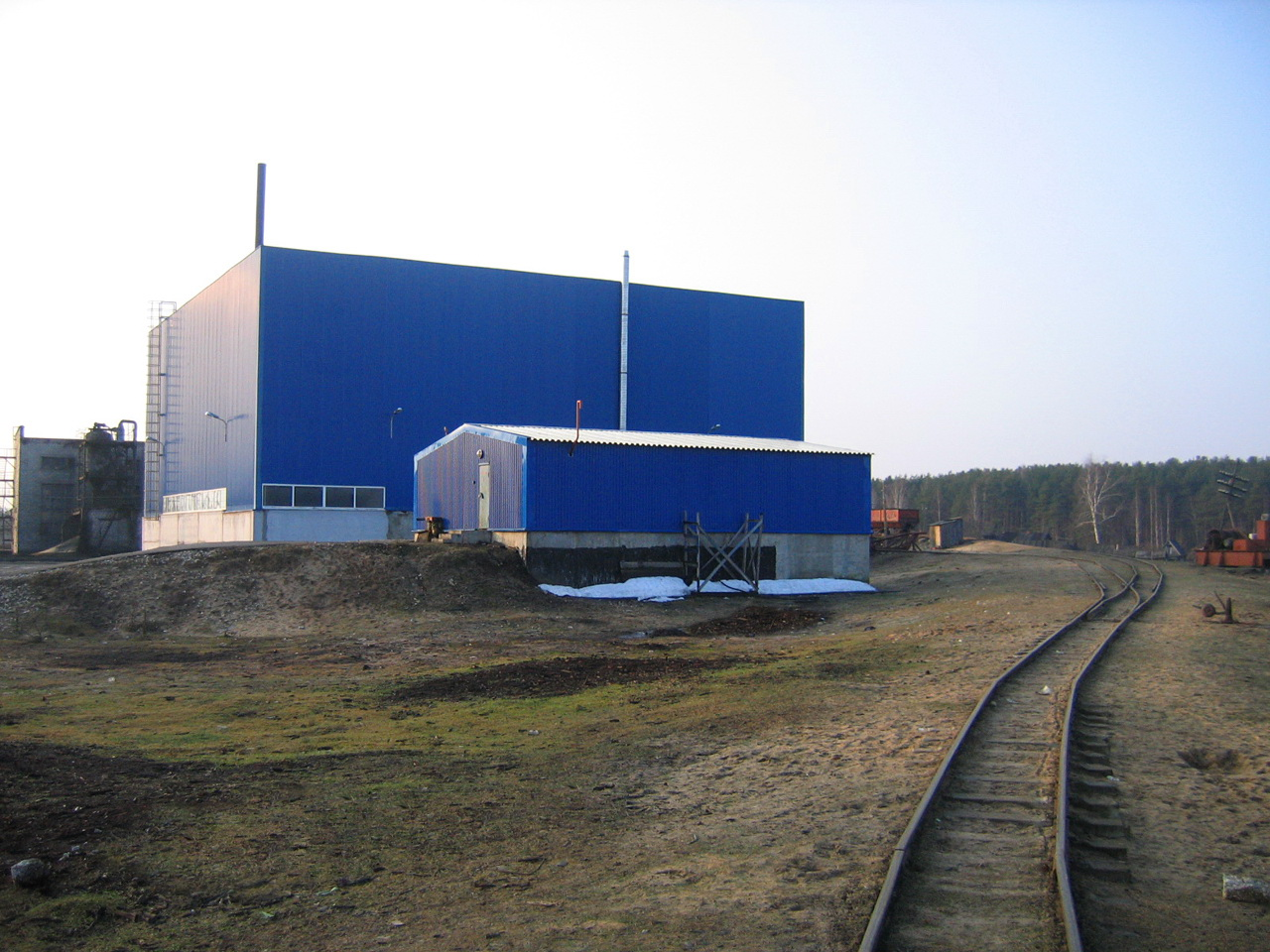
Peat briquette factory

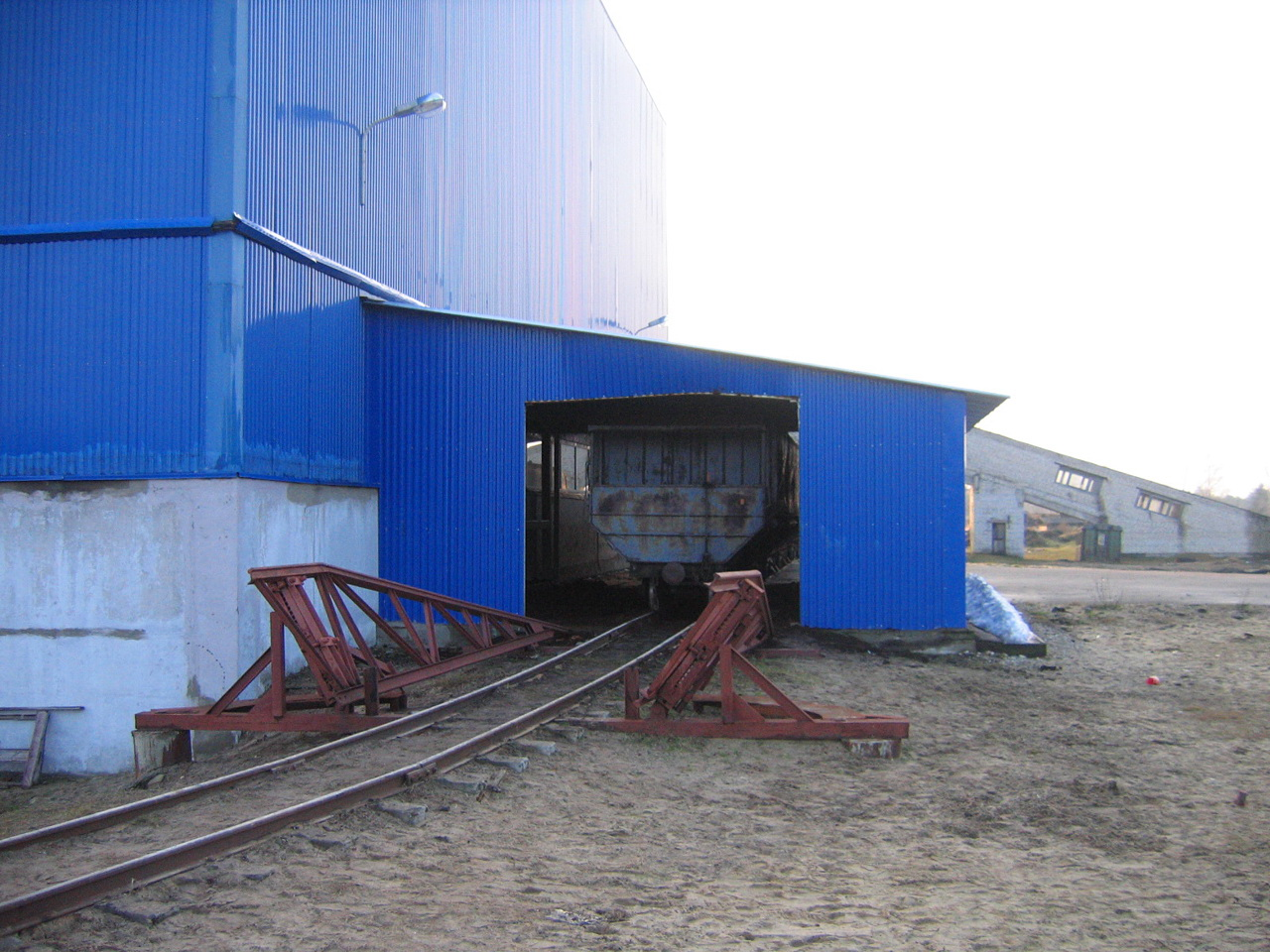
Open wagon unloading peat

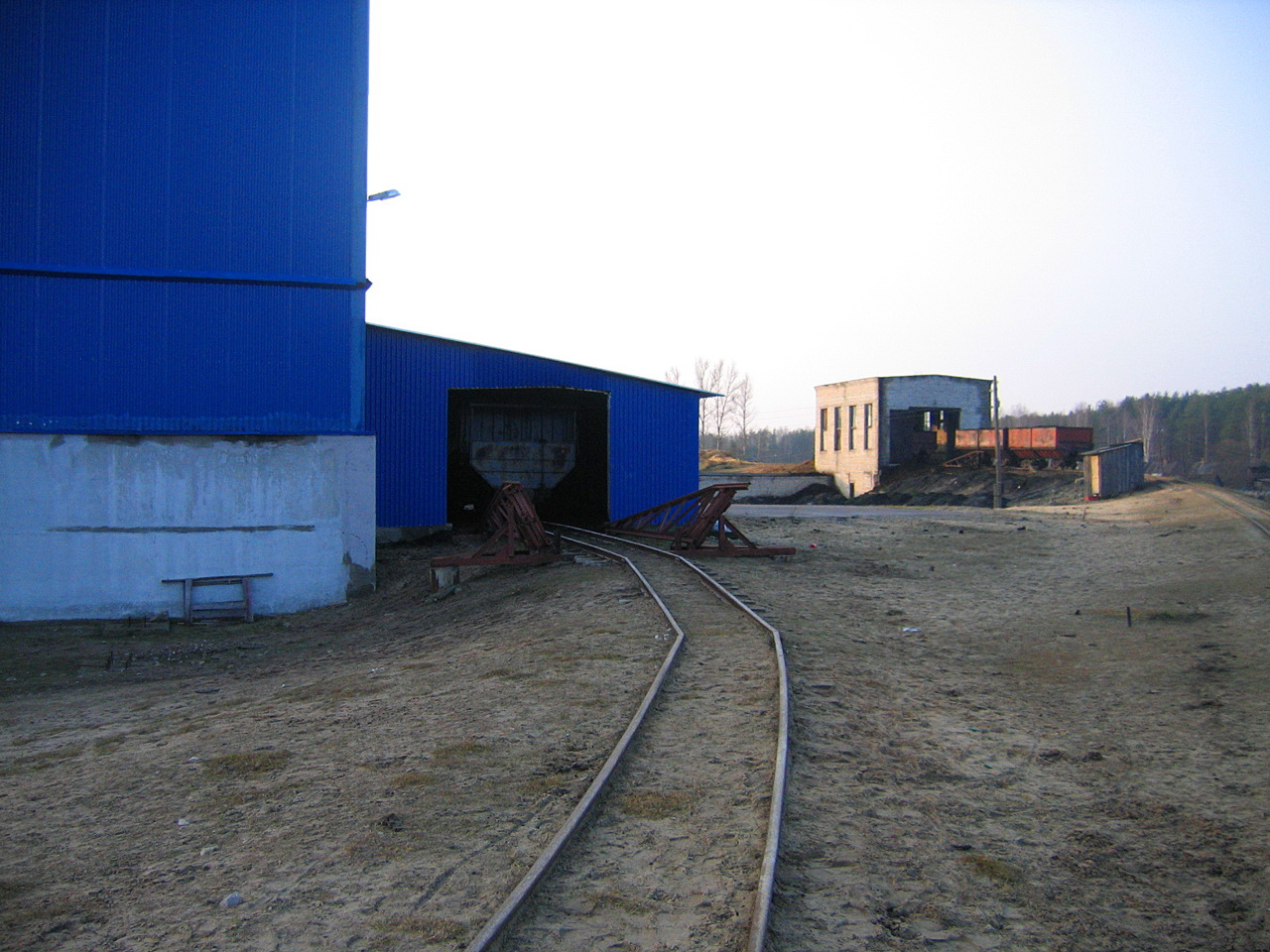
Peat briquette factory

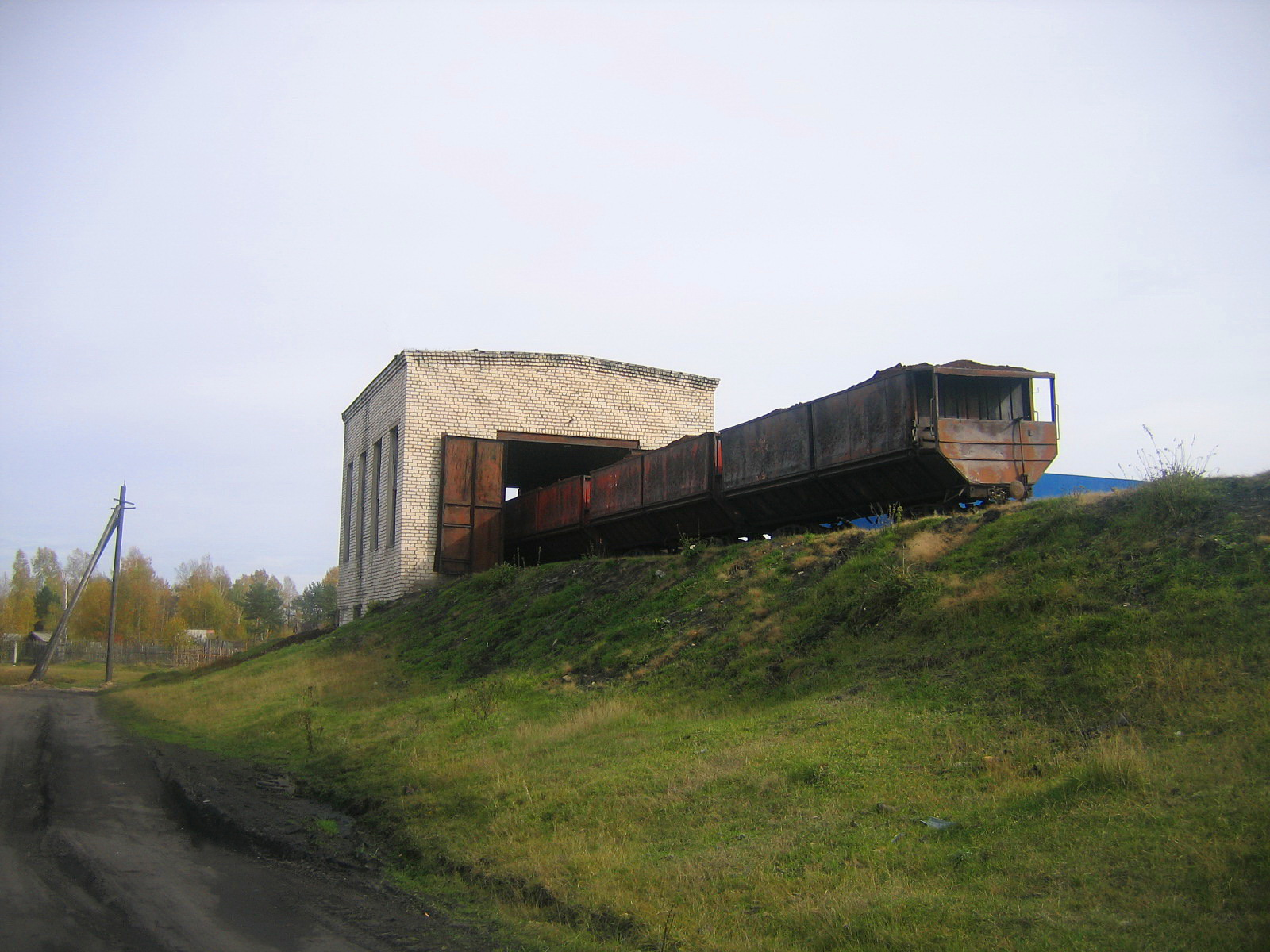
Open wagon for peat

== See also ==
- Narrow-gauge railways in Russia
- Altsevo peat railway
- Narrow-gauge railway of Decor-1 factory
