= Narrow-gauge railway of Decor-1 factory =

Coordinates: 55.31988°N 43.94857°E

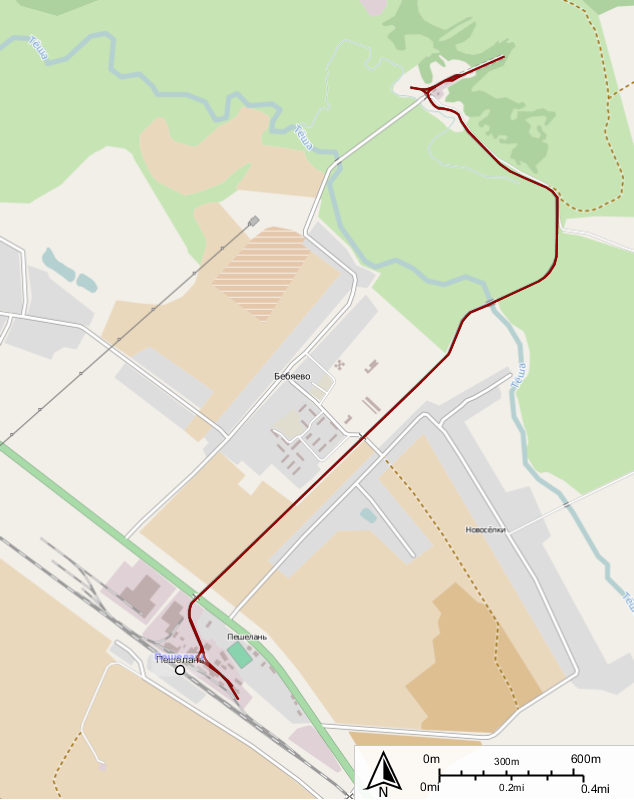

Overview
- Locale: Nizhny Novgorod Oblast, Russia
- Termini: Peshelan
- Website: www.pgz-dekor.ru

Service
- Type: Narrow-gauge railway
- Operator(s): ООО Пешеланский гипсовый завод «Декор-1»

History
- Opened: 1946

Technical
- Line length: 4 kilometres (2.5 mi)
- Track gauge: 750 mm (2 ft 5 1/2 in)

The Decor-1 factory railway is in the Nizhny Novgorod Oblast, Russia. The railway was opened in 1946, and has a total length of 4 kilometres (2.5 mi) its track gauge is 750 mm (2 ft 5 1/2 in). The railway is used for the transportation of gypsum from the mine to the «Dekor-1» factory.

== Current status ==
Peshelan gypsum factory «Dekor-1» located near the town of Arzamas, Nizhny Novgorod Oblast. In 1946 a gypsum mine was opened in the village of Bebyayevo. Ten trains run on the railway each day.

== Rolling stock ==
=== Locomotives ===
- TU6A – № 1473, 2574
- TU8 – № 0340, 0342
- Traction rolling stock in the mine – electric

=== Railroad car ===
- Snow blower
- Minecart for transportation of gypsum

== Gallery ==
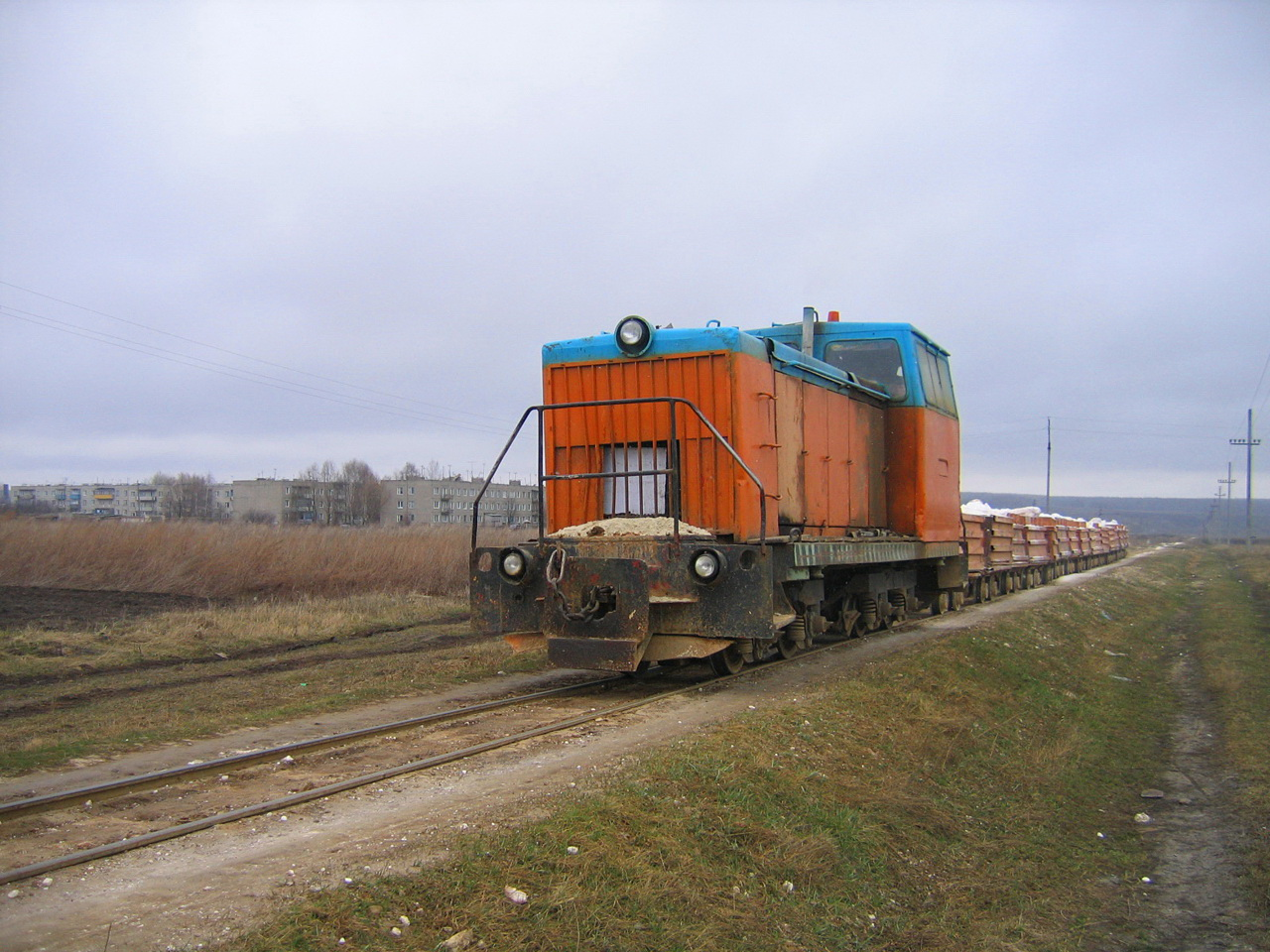
TU8 – № 0340 (2007)

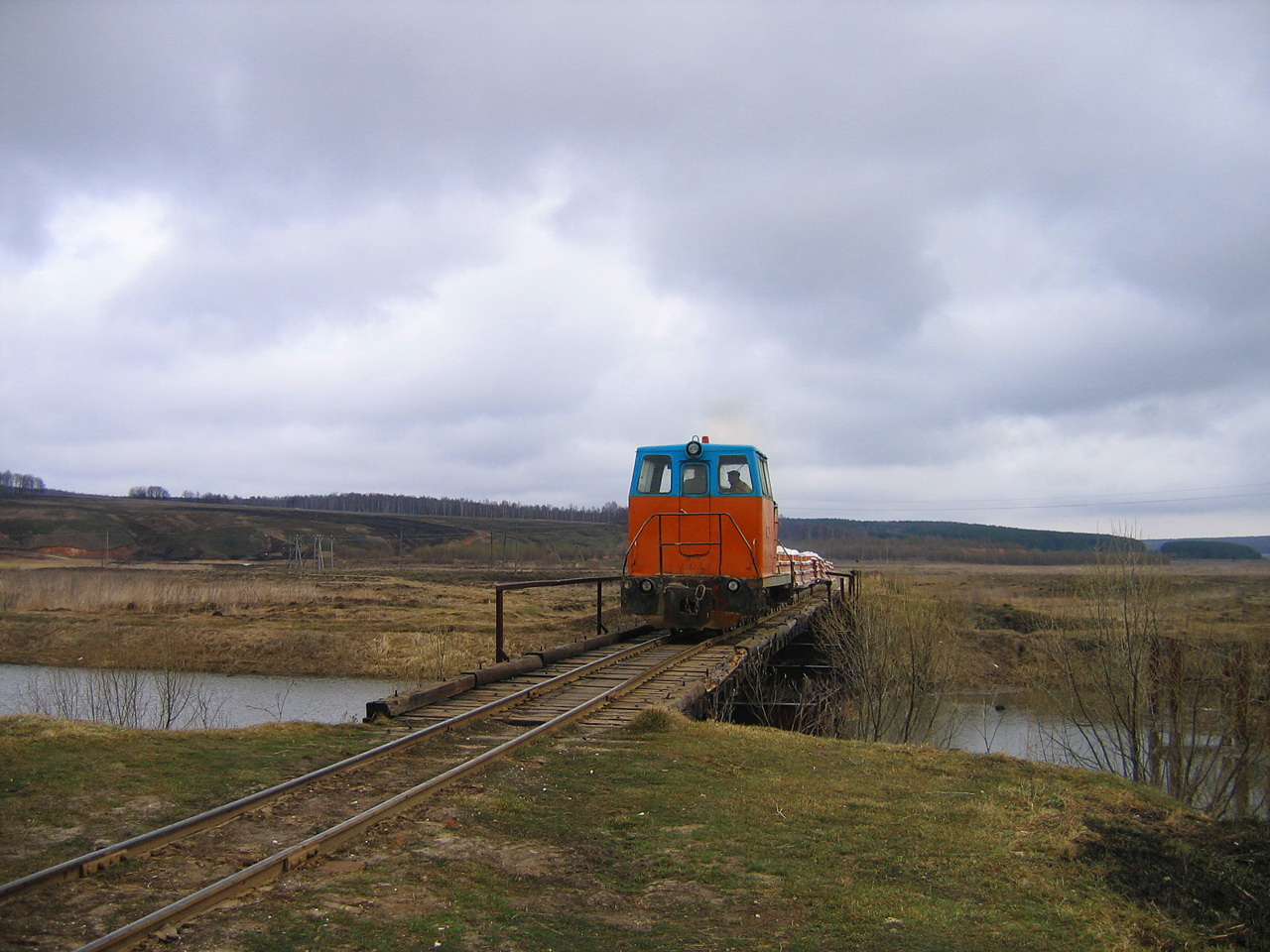
TU8 – № 0340 (2007)

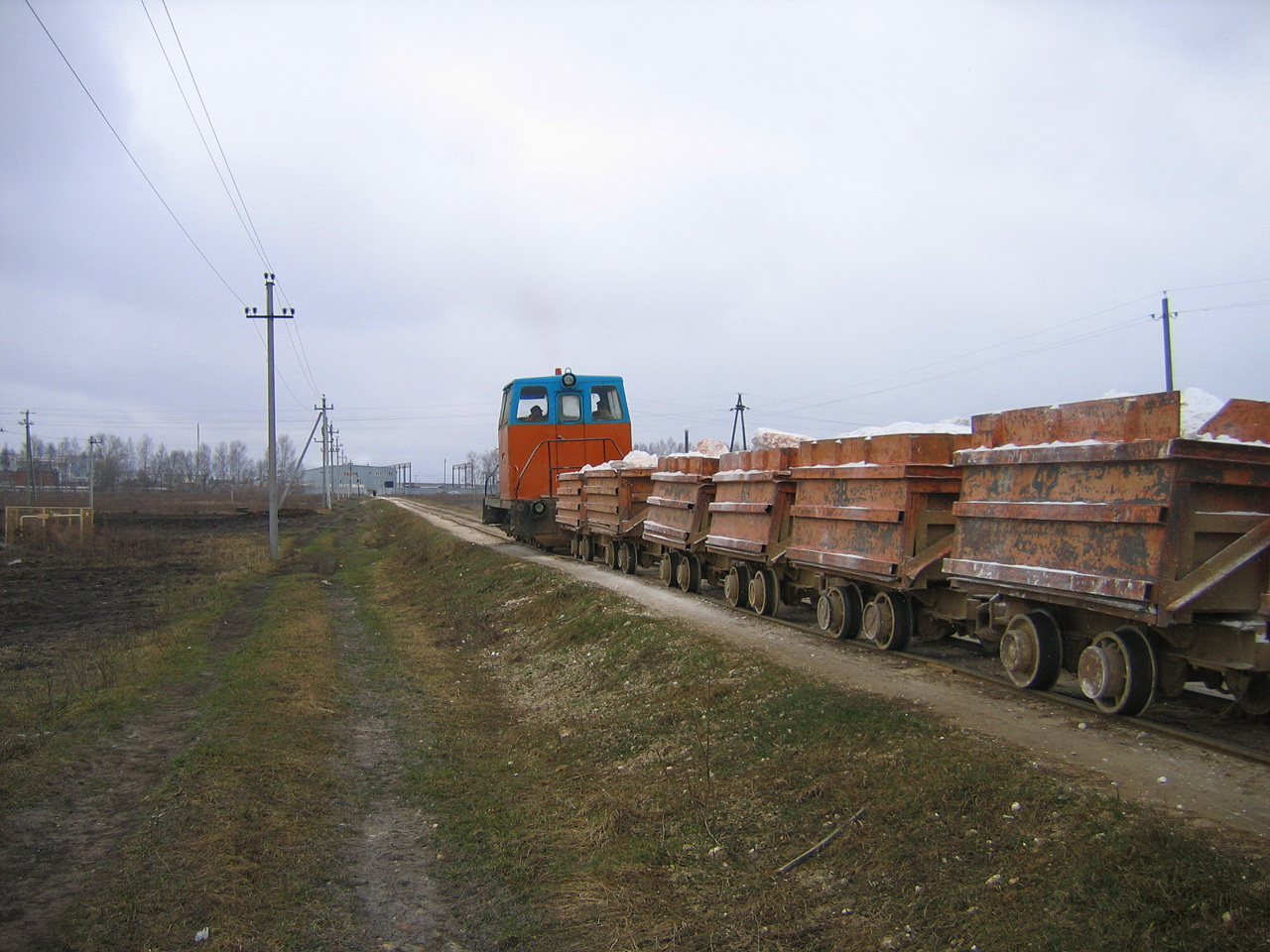
TU8 – № 0340 (2007)

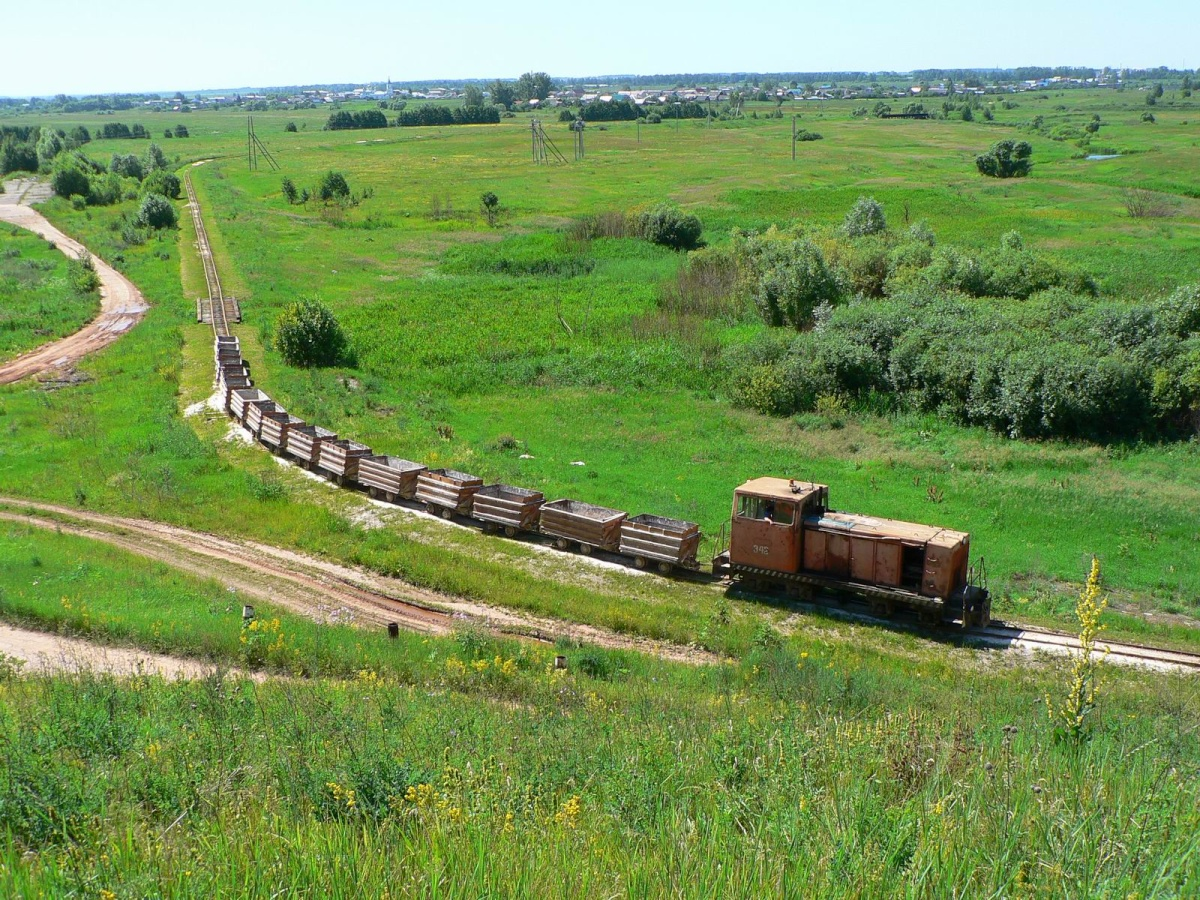
TU8 – № 0342 (2014)

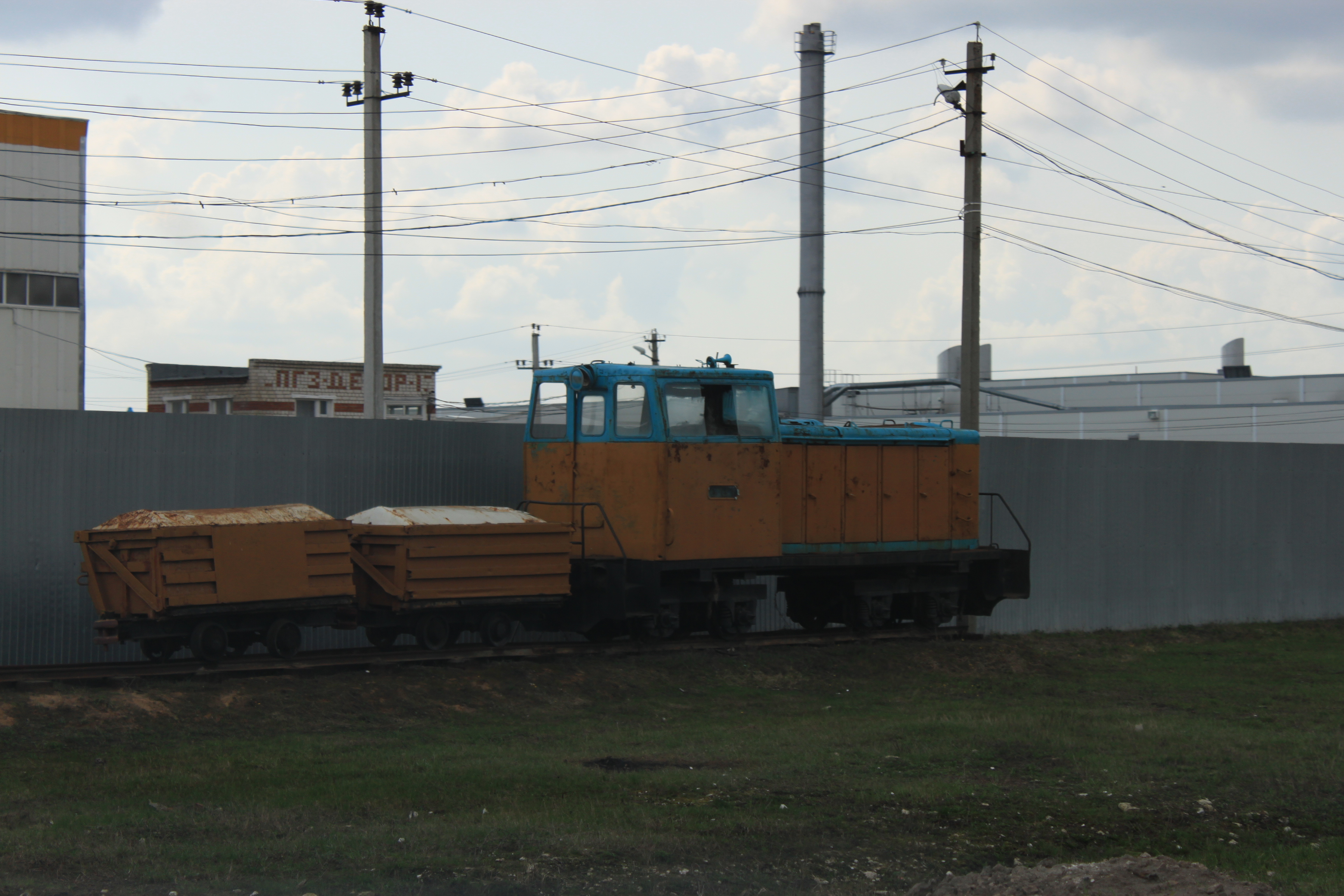
TU6 – № 2574 (2012)

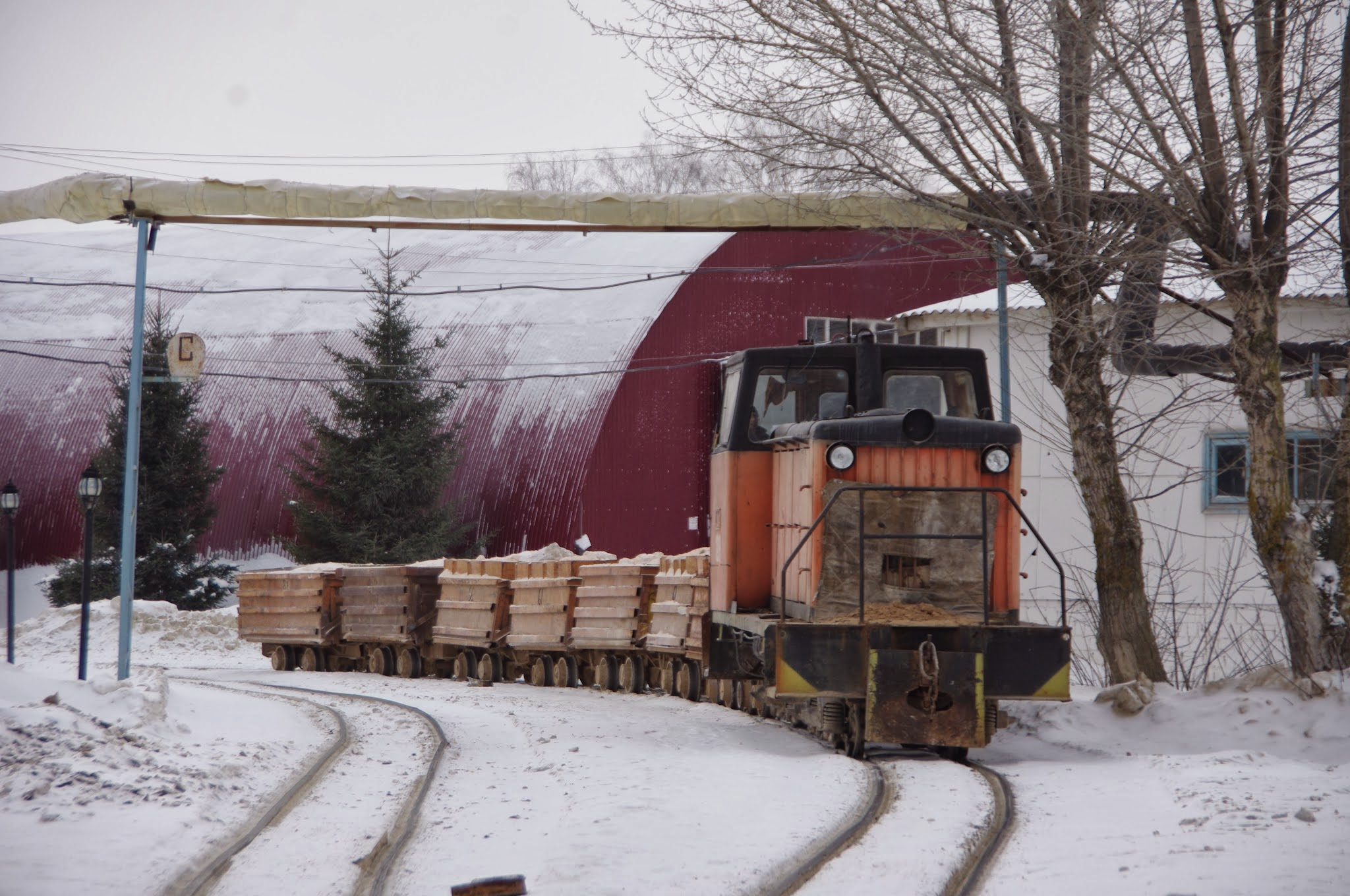
ТУ6А – № 1473 (2014)

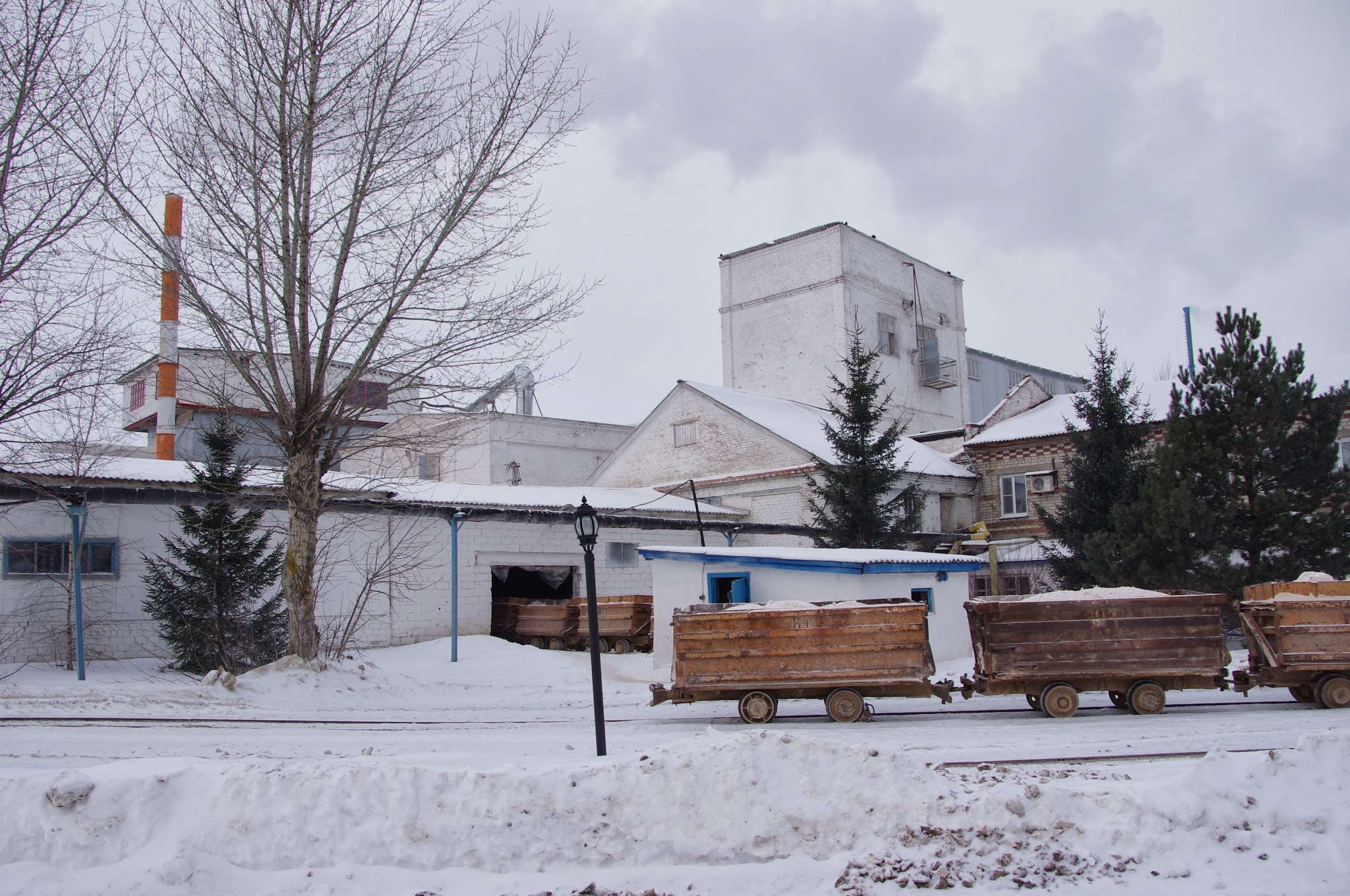
Peshelan gypsum factory (2014)

== See also ==
- Narrow-gauge railways in Russia
- Altsevo peat narrow-gauge railway
- Kerzhenets peat narrow-gauge railway
- Pizhemskaya narrow gauge railway
