= Rudnyanskoye Urban Settlement =

Rudnyanskoye Urban Settlement is the name of several municipal formations in Russia.

- Rudnyanskoye Urban Settlement, an administrative division and a municipal formation which the town of Rudnya in Rudnyansky District of Smolensk Oblast is incorporated as.
- Rudnyanskoye Urban Settlement, a municipal formation which the Urban-Type Settlement of Rudnya in Rudnyansky District of Volgograd Oblast is incorporated as.

== See also ==
- Rudnyansky (disambiguation)
