= Altsevo peat railway =

Railway line in Russia

Coordinates: 57.8699°N 47.1103°E

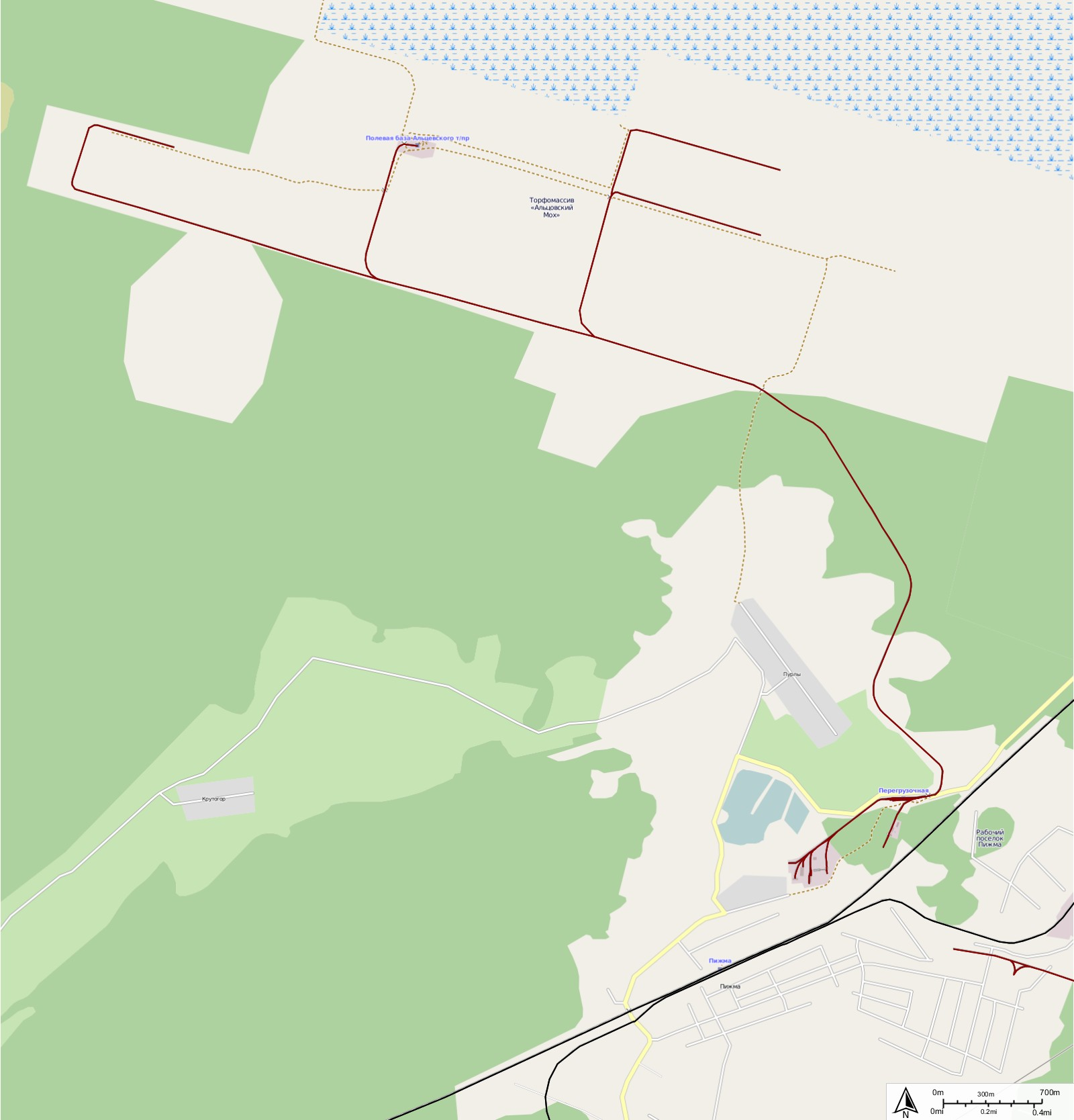

Overview
- Locale: Nizhny Novgorod Oblast, Russia
- Termini: Pizhma

Service
- Type: Narrow-gauge railway
- Operator(s): ООО «Альцево-торф»

History
- Opened: 1962

Technical
- Line length: 10 kilometres (6.2 mi)
- Track gauge: 750 mm (2 ft 5 1/2 in)
Route map
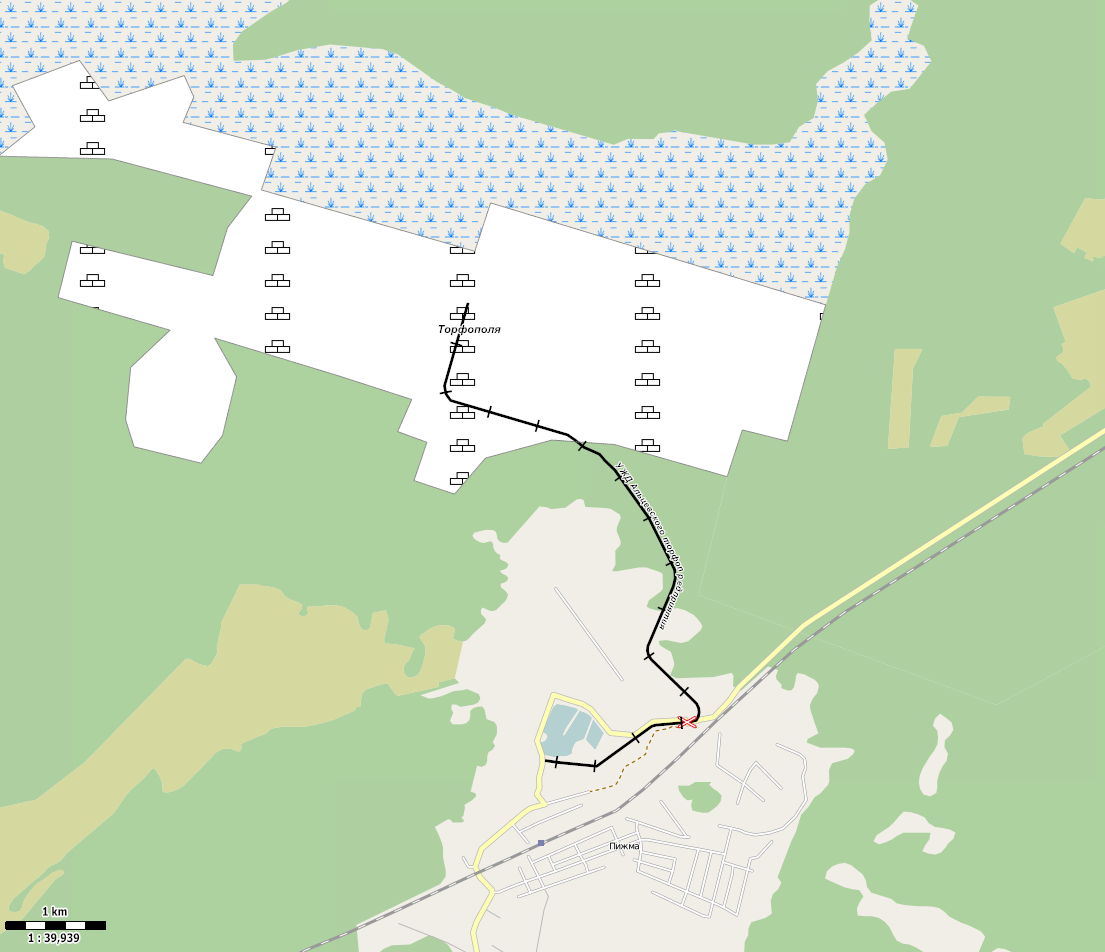

The Altsevo peat railway is located in Nizhny Novgorod Oblast, Russia. The peat railway was opened in 1962, and has a total length of 10 kilometres (6.2 mi) and a track gauge of 750 mm (2 ft 5 1/2 in).

== Current status ==
The Altsevo peat railway was constructed in 1962 in the Tonshayevsky District, and runs from the village of Pizhma to the swamp "Altsovsky Moss". The railway was built for hauling peat and workers and operates year-round with several pairs of trains a day. A peat briquette factory was built and put into operation in 2005.

== Rolling stock ==
=== Locomotives ===
- TU6A - No. 0310
- TU8 - No.***
- ESU2A - No. 671
- TD-5U "Pioneer" - Transportation local residents

=== Railroad car ===
- Flat wagon
- Tank wagon
- Snowplow
- Crane (rail)
- Tank wagon - fire train
- Passenger car (rail)
- Track laying cranes
- Open wagon for peat
- Hopper wagon to transport track ballast

== Gallery ==
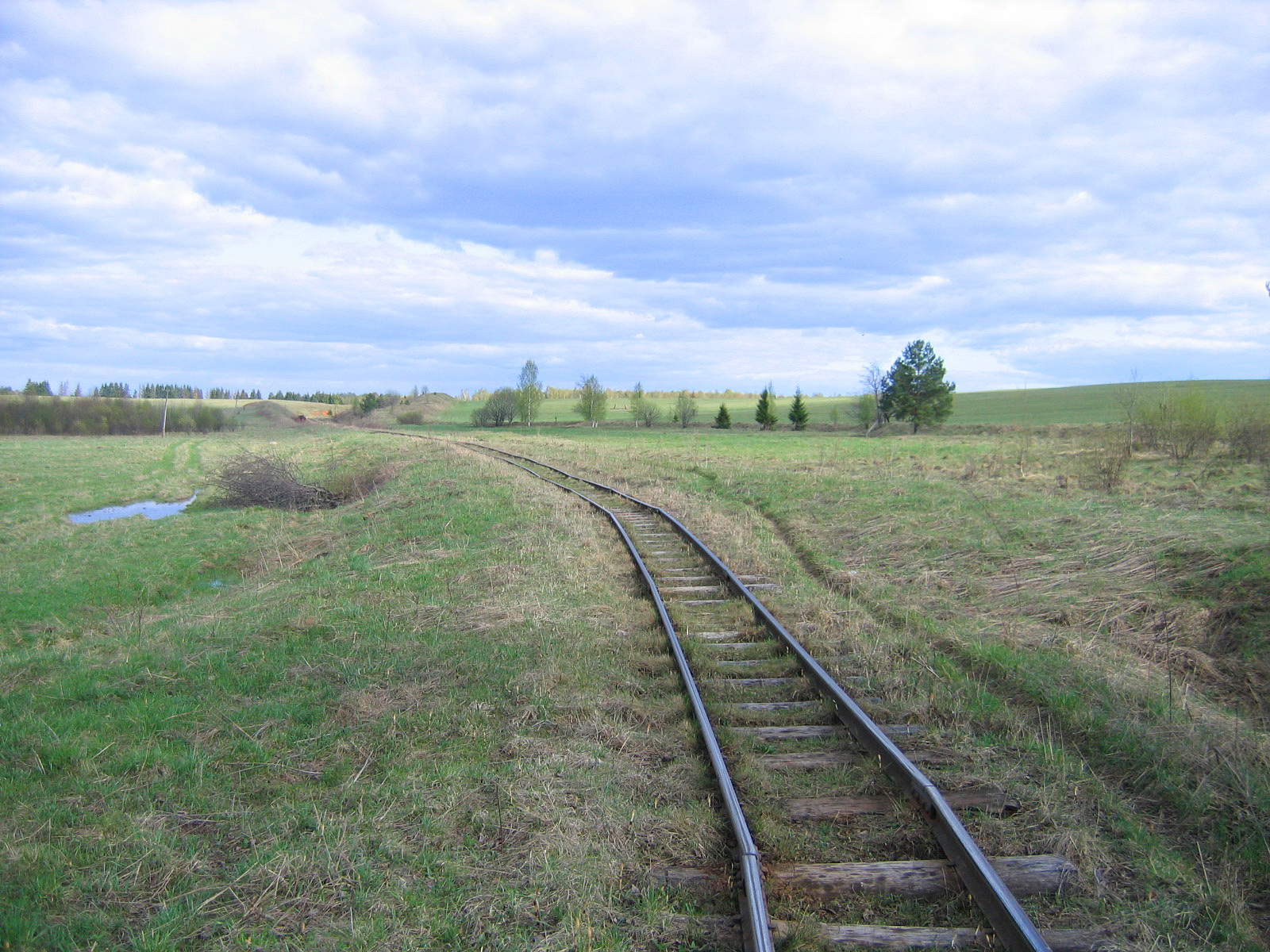
Narrow-gauge railway

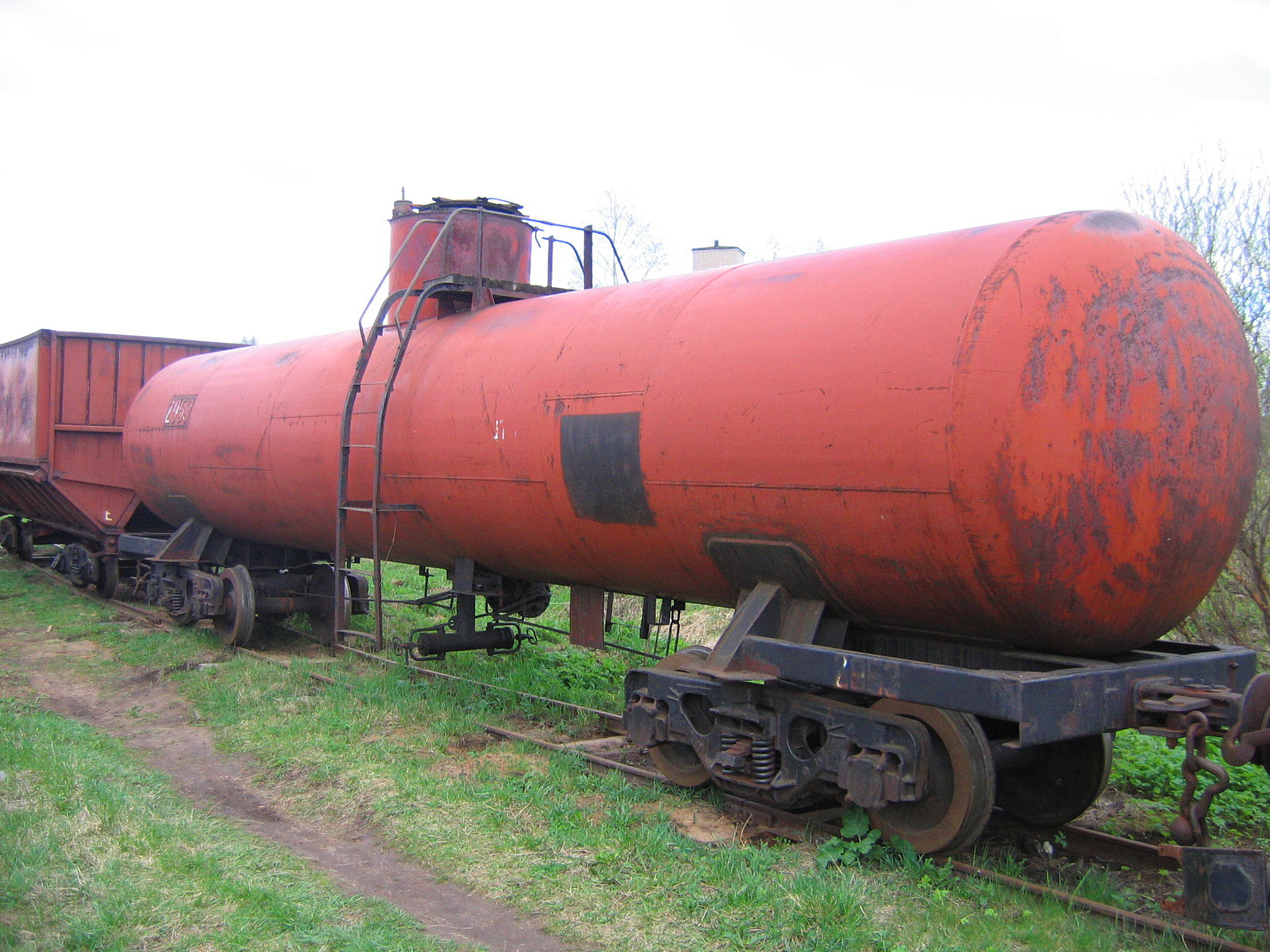
Tank wagon

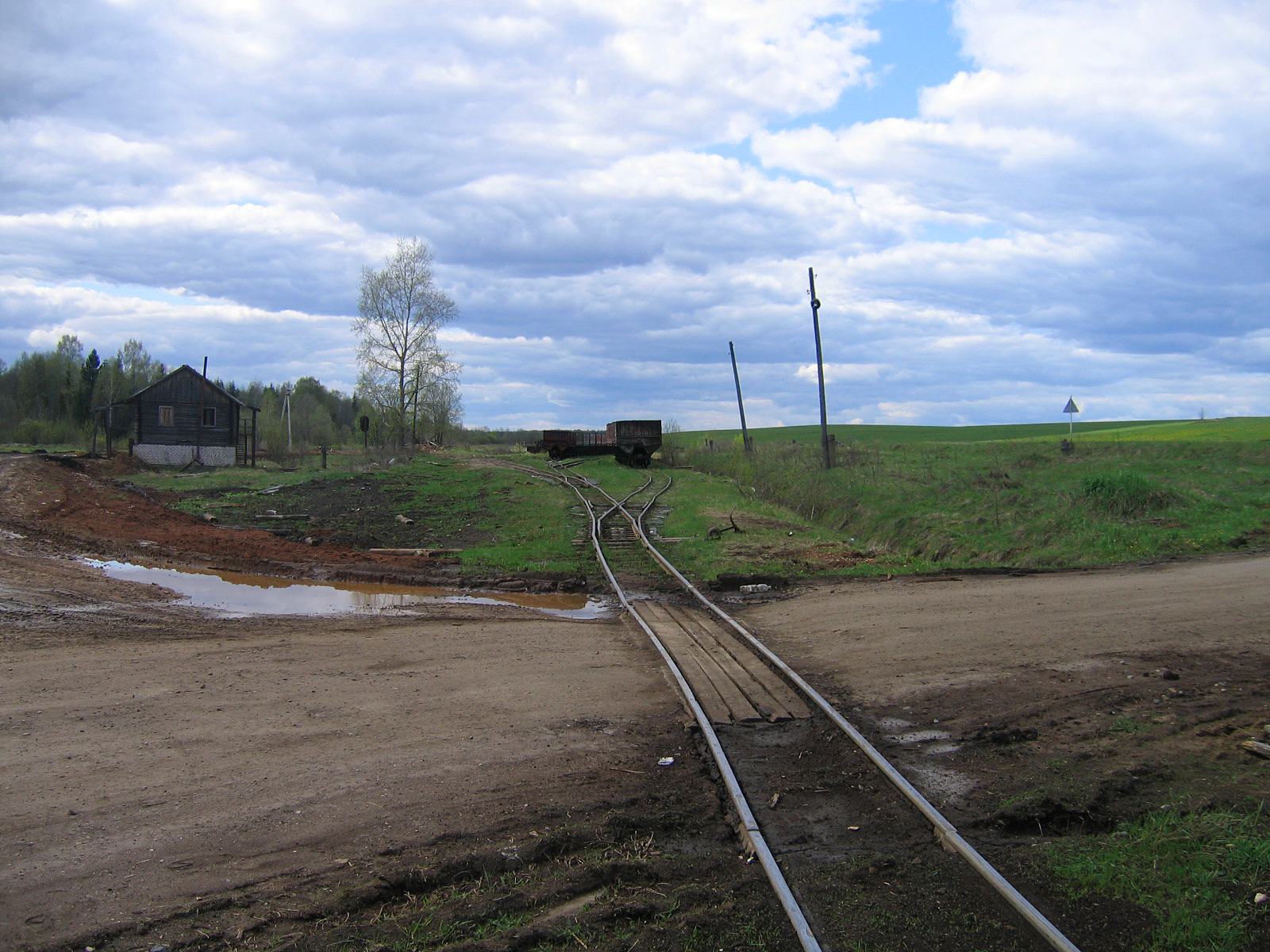
Open wagon for peat

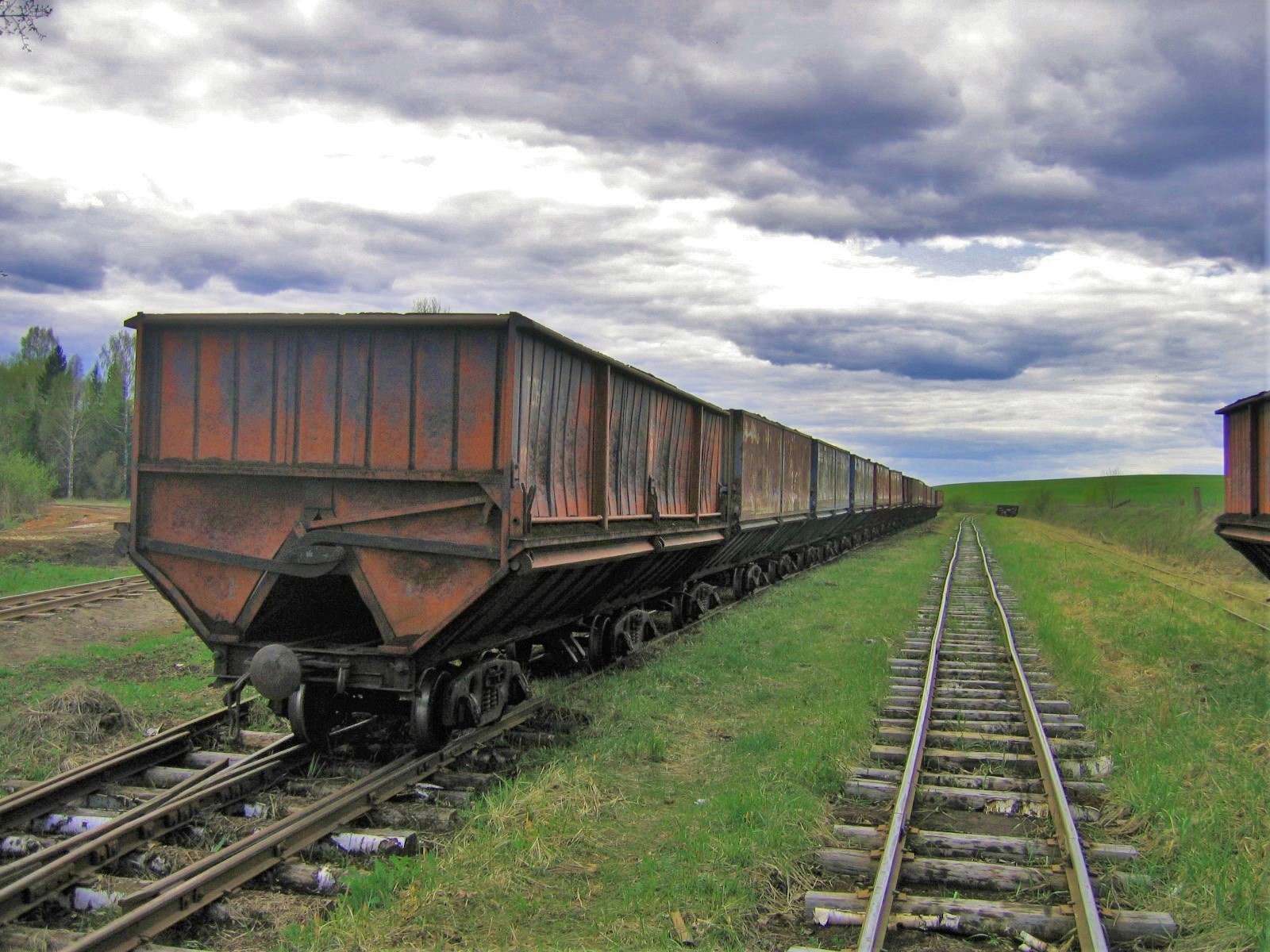
Open wagon for peat

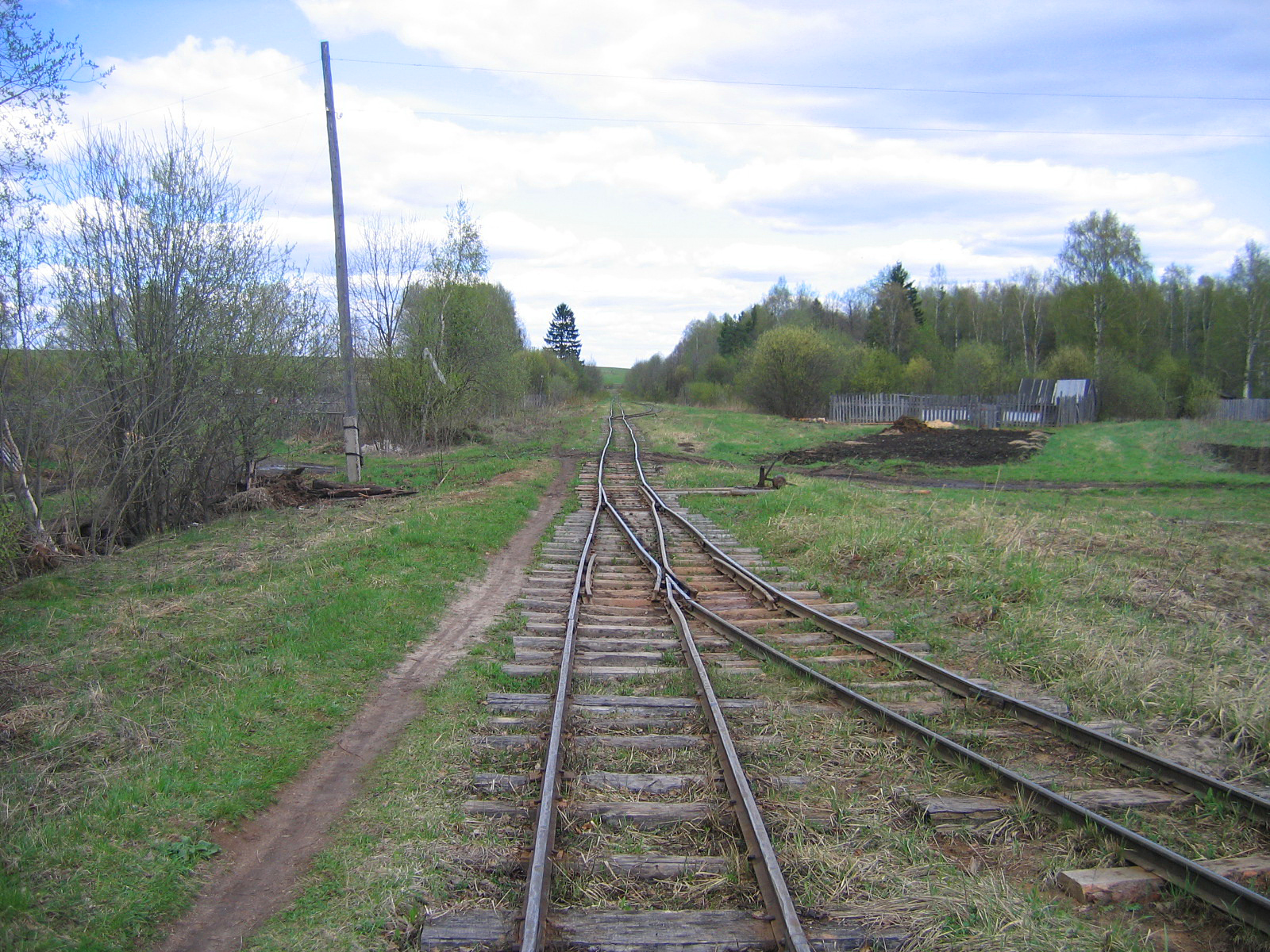
Peat railway

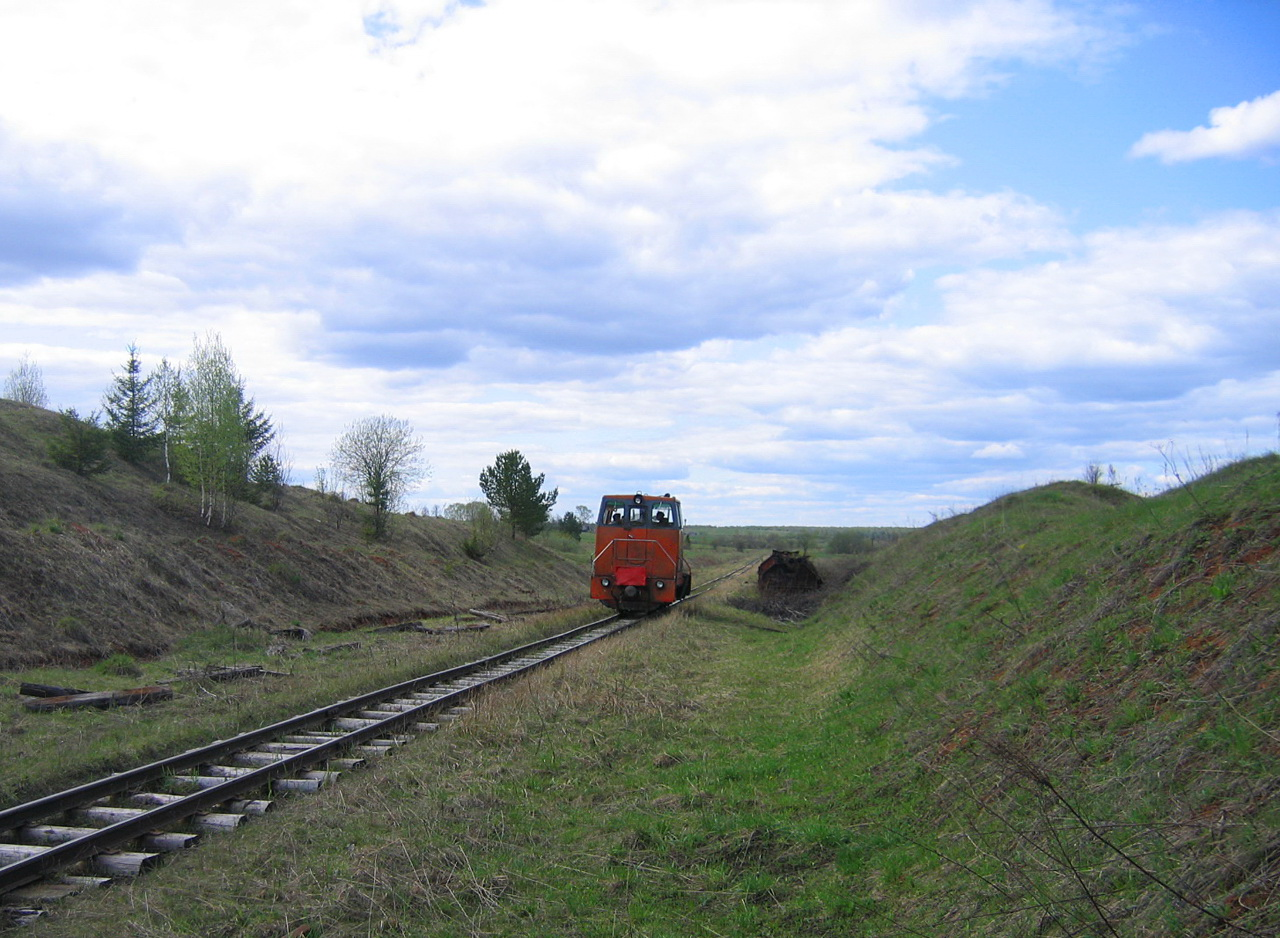
TU8 locomotive

== See also ==
- Narrow-gauge railways in Russia
- Kerzhenets peat narrow-gauge railway
- Narrow-gauge railway of Decor-1 factory
