= Yakovtsevo =

Yakovtsevo Яковцево
- Village
- Location within Vologda Oblast Location within Russia
- Coordinates: 59°11′N 39°26′E
- Country: Russia
- Region: Vologda Oblast
- District: Vologodsky District
- Time zone: UTC+3:00

Yakovtsevo (Russian: Яковцево) is a rural locality (a village) in Staroselskoye Rural Settlement, Vologodsky District, Vologda Oblast, Russia. The population was 1 as of 2002.

== Geography ==
Yakovtsevo is located 30 km southwest of Vologda (the district's administrative centre) by road. Abramovo is the nearest rural locality.
