= Pizhma, Nizhny Novgorod Oblast =

Pizhma Пижма
- Urban-type settlement
- Interactive map of Pizhma
- Location of Pizhma Pizhma (Nizhny Novgorod Oblast)
- Coordinates: 57.8612°N 47.1033°E
- Country: Russia
- Federal subject: Nizhny Novgorod Oblast
- Administrative district: Tonshayevsky District

Population (2010 Census)
  - Total: 4,309
  - Estimate (2025): 3,404 (−21%)
- Time zone: UTC+3 (MSK)
- Postal code: 606930
- OKTMO ID: 22653154051

Pizhma (Russian: Пи́жма) is an urban locality (an urban-type settlement) in Tonshayevsky District of Nizhny Novgorod Oblast, Russia.

== Population ==
Population:

4,309 (2010 census);[1] 4,339 (2002 census);[4] 5,253 (1989 Soviet census).[5]
