= Pizhemskaya narrow gauge railway =

Coordinates: 57.863482°N 47.134987°E

Overview
- Locale: Nizhny Novgorod Oblast, Russia
- Termini: Pizhma
- Website: www.rosplit.ru

Service
- Type: Narrow-gauge railway
- Operator(s): LLC «Pizhmales»

History
- Opened: 1926

Technical
- Line length: 12 kilometres (7.5 mi)
- Track gauge: 750 mm (2 ft 5 1/2 in)
Route map
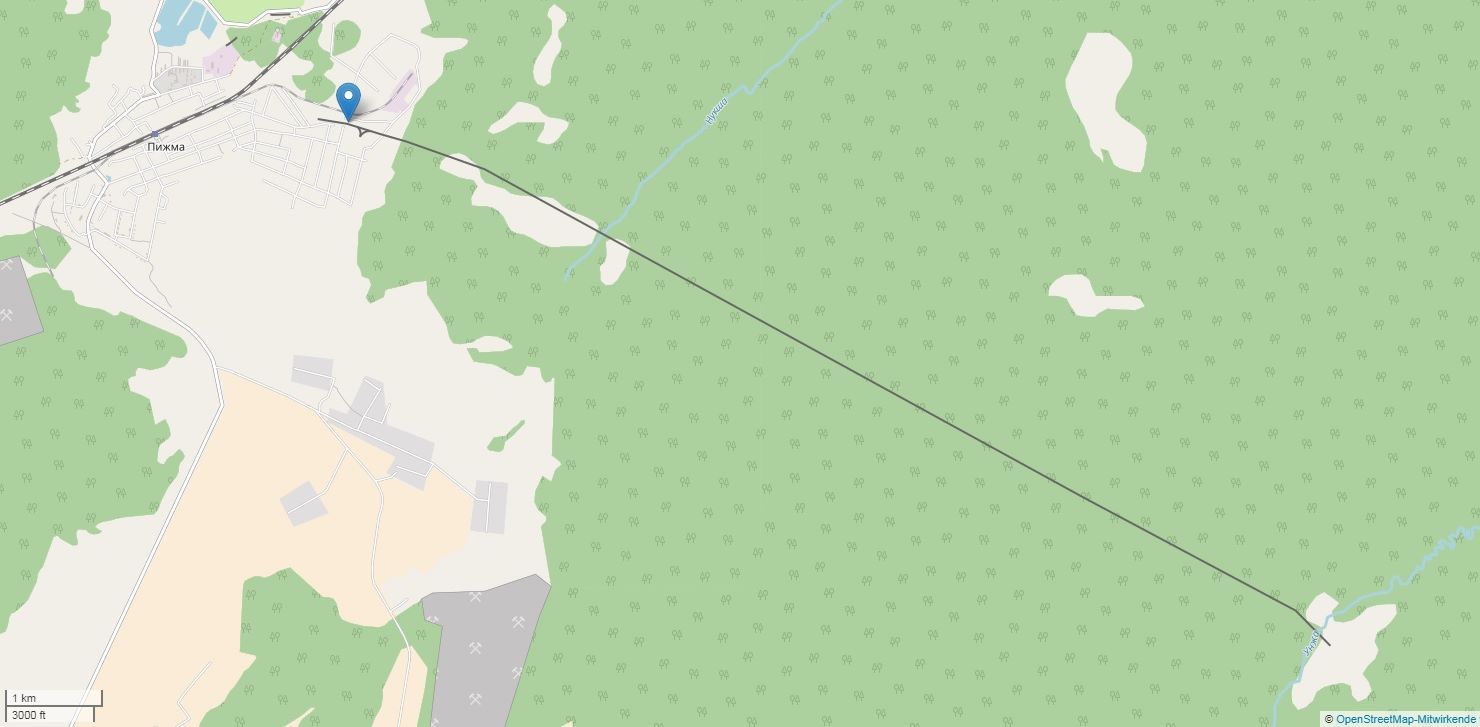

The Pizhemskaya narrow gauge railway (Russian: Пижменская узкоколейная железная дорога, Pizhemskaya uzkokoleynaya zheleznaya doroga) is a narrow-gauge railway in Nizhny Novgorod Oblast, Russia, built as an industrial railway (forest railway) for logging operations. The forest railway was opened in 1926, has a total length of 12 kilometres (7.5 mi) and is operational as of 2017, the track gauge is 750 mm (2 ft 5 1/2 in) and operates year-round.

== Current status ==
Planning for the railway and building began in 1926. The Pizhemskaya logging railway's first line was constructed in 1926, in the area of Tonshayevsky District in Nizhny Novgorod Oblast from the village Pizhma. The total length of the Pizhemskaya narrow-gauge railway at the peak of its development exceeded 80 kilometres (50 mi), of which 12 kilometres (7.5 mi) is currently operational. The railway operates scheduled freight services from Pizhma, used for forestry tasks such as the transportation of felled logs and forestry workers. In 2017, repairs are being made to the track.

== Rolling stock ==
=== Locomotives ===
- TU6A – № 0755, 3068
- Draisine – TD-5u "Pioneer" transportation local residents

=== Railroad cars ===
- Tank car
- Bunk Car "Teplushka"
- Railway log-car and flatcar
- Hopper car to transport track ballast

=== Work trains ===
- Snowplow PS-1

== See also ==
- Narrow-gauge railways in Russia
- Narrow-gauge railway of Decor-1 factory
- List of Russian narrow-gauge railways rolling stock
