= Abramovo, Perm Krai =

Abramovo
- Village
- Location within Perm Krai Location within Russia
- Coordinates: 59°56′N 54°57′E
- Country: Russia
- Region: Perm Krai
- District: Kosinsky District
- Time zone: UTC+5:00

Abramovo (Russian: Абрамово) is a rural locality (a village) in Kosinskoye Rural Settlement of Kosinsky District, Perm Krai, Russia. The population was 66 as of 2010. There is 1 street.

== Geography ==
Abramovo is located 2 km west of Kosa (the district's administrative centre) by road. Kosa is the nearest rural locality.
