= Abramovo, Sverdlovsk Oblast =

Abramovo Абрамово
- Selo
- Location within Sverdlovsk Oblast Location within Russia
- Coordinates: 56°22′N 61°00′E
- Country: Russia
- Region: Sverdlovsk Oblast
- District: Sysertsky District

Population
  - Total: 224
- Time zone: UTC+5:00
- Postal code: 624015

Abramovo (Russian: Абрамово) is a rural locality (a selo) in Sysertsky District, Sverdlovsk Oblast, Russia. The population was 224 as of 2021. There are 9 streets.

== Geography ==
Abramovo is located 22 km southeast of Sysert (the district's administrative centre) by road. Lechebny is the nearest rural locality.

== History ==
In 1865, a church was built in the village.

On June 5, 2018, this village was renamed Abramovo from Abramovskoye.
