= Abramovo, Vladimir Oblast =

Abramovo Абрамово
- Village
- Location within Vladimir Oblast Location within Russia
- Coordinates: 55°34′N 41°47′E
- Country: Russia
- Region: Vladimir Oblast
- District: Melenkovsky_District
- Time zone: UTC+3:00

Abramovo (Russian: Абрамово) is a rural locality (a village) in Denyatinskoye Rural Settlement of Melenkovsky_District, Vladimir Oblast, Russia. The population was 1 as of 2010. There are 2 streets.

== Geography ==
Abramovo is located 33 km north of Melenki (the district's administrative centre) by road. Novo-Barsukovo is the nearest rural locality.
