= Abramovo, Moscow Oblast =

Abramovo Абрамово
- Village
- Location within Moscow Oblast Location within Russia
- Coordinates: 56°16′N 38°14′E
- Country: Russia
- Region: Moscow Oblast
- District: Sergiyevo-Posadsky District
- Time zone: UTC+3:00

Abramovo (Russian: Абрамово) is a rural locality (a village) in Lozovskoye Rural Settlement of Sergiyevo-Posadsky District, Moscow Oblast, Russia. The population was 736 as of 2010. There are 4 streets.

== Geography ==
Abramovo is located 10 km southeast of Sergiyev Posad (the district's administrative centre) by road. Ilyinki is the nearest rural locality.
