= Abramovo, Leningrad Oblast =

Abramovo Абрамово
- Village
- Location within Leningrad Oblast Location within Russia
- Coordinates: 60°01′N 33°54′E
- Country: Russia
- Region: Leningrad Oblast
- District: Tikhvinsky District
- Time zone: UTC+3:00

Abramovo (Russian: Абрамово) is a rural locality (a village) in Gankovskoye Rural Settlement of Tikhvinsky District, Leningrad Oblast, Russia. The population was 6 as of 2017.

== Geography ==
Abramovo is located 60 km northeast of Tikhvin (the district's administrative centre) by road. Terenino is the nearest rural locality.
