= Rudnyansky District =

Location of Smolensk Oblast in Russia

Location of Volgograd Oblast in Russia

Rudnyansky District is the name of several administrative and municipal districts in Russia:

- Rudnyansky District, Smolensk Oblast, an administrative and municipal district of Smolensk Oblast
- Rudnyansky District, Volgograd Oblast, an administrative and municipal district of Volgograd Oblast

== See also ==
- Rudnyansky (disambiguation)
