= Abramovo, Vologda Oblast =

Abramovo Абрамово
- Village
- Location within Vologda Oblast Location within Russia
- Coordinates: 59°11′N 39°25′E
- Country: Russia
- Region: Vologda Oblast
- District: Vologodsky District
- Time zone: UTC+3:00

Abramovo (Russian: Абрамово) is a rural locality (a village) in Staroselskoye Rural Settlement of Vologodsky District, Vologda Oblast, Russia. The population was 6 as of 2002.

== Geography ==
Abramovo is located 30 km west of Vologda (the district's administrative centre) by road. Yakovtsevo is the nearest rural locality.
