= Abramovo, Novosibirsk Oblast =

Abramovo Абрамово
- Selo
- Location within Novosibirsk Oblast Location within Russia
- Coordinates: 55°26′N 78°13′E
- Country: Russia
- Region: Novosibirsk Oblast
- District: Kuybyshevsky District
- Time zone: UTC+7:00

Abramovo (Russian: Абрамово) is a rural locality (a selo) and the administrative center of Abramovsky Selsoviet of Kuybyshevsky District, Novosibirsk Oblast, Russia. The population was 1222 as of 2010. There are 19 streets.

== Geography ==
Abramovo is located 7 km west of Kuybyshev (the district's administrative centre) by road. Kuybyshev is the nearest rural locality.

== Ethnicity ==
The village is inhabited by Russians.
