= Arzamassky District =

Arzamassky District Арзамасский район (Russian)
- District
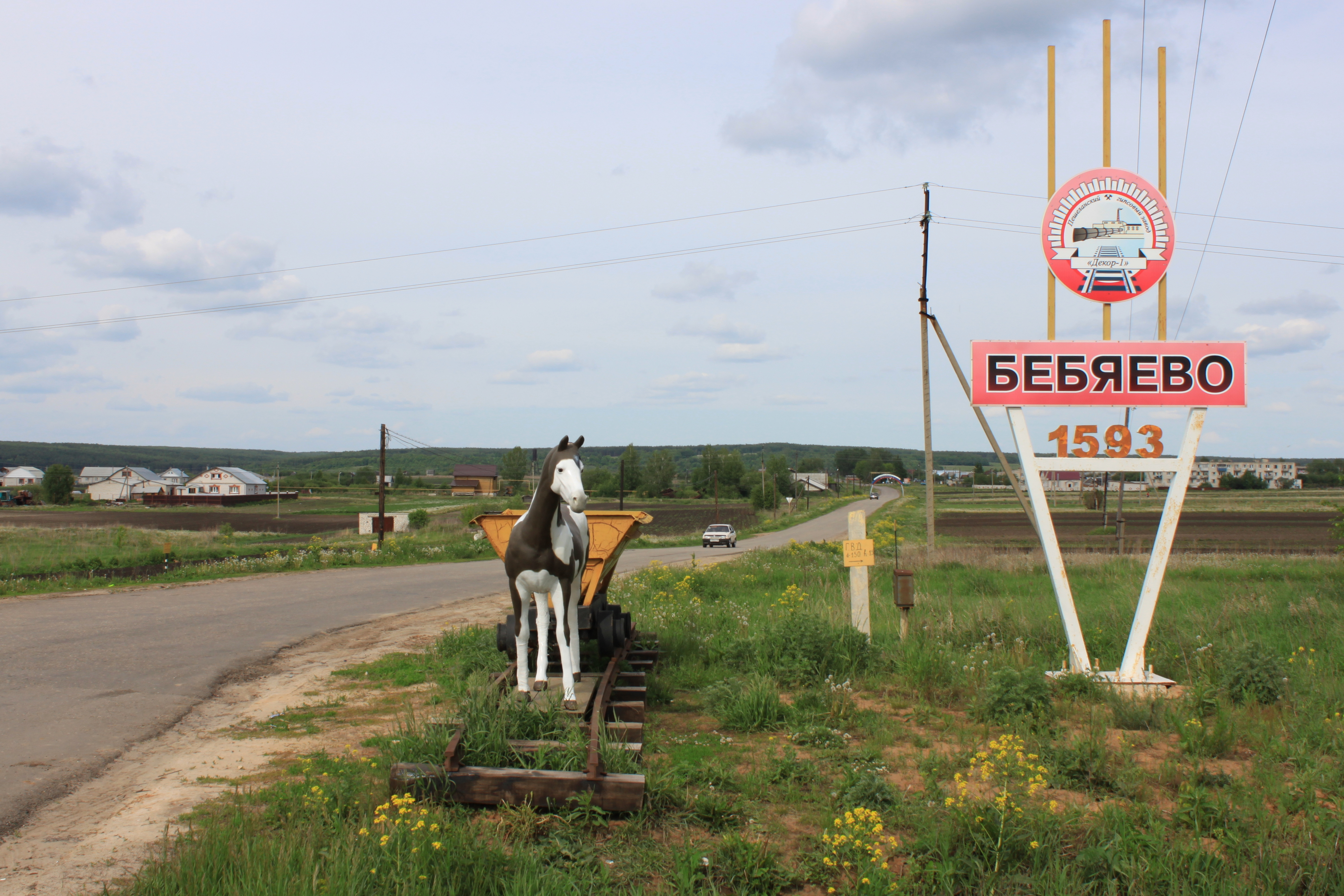
- Entrance to the village of Bebyayevo in Arzamassky District

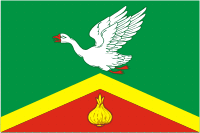
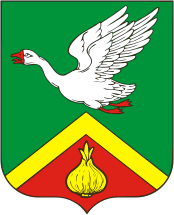
- Flag Coat of arms
- Location of Arzamassky District in Nizhny Novgorod Oblast
- Coordinates: 55°24′N 43°49′E
- Country: Russia
- Federal subject: Nizhny Novgorod Oblast
- Established: 1929
- Administrative center: Arzamas

Area
  - Total: 2,016.9 km^{2} (778.7 sq mi)

Population (2010 Census)
  - Total: 43,723
  - Density: 21.678/km^{2} (56.147/sq mi)
  - Urban: 18.5%
  - Rural: 81.5%

Administrative structure
  - Administrative divisions: 1 Work settlements, 12 Selsoviets
  - Inhabited localities: 1 urban-type settlements, 104 rural localities

Municipal structure
  - Municipally incorporated as: Arzamassky Municipal District
  - Municipal divisions: 1 urban settlements, 12 rural settlements
- Time zone: UTC+3 (MSK)
- OKTMO ID: 22603000
- Website: http://arz.omsu-nnov.ru

Arzamassky District (Russian: Арзама́сский райо́н) is an administrative district (raion), one of the forty in Nizhny Novgorod Oblast, Russia. Municipally, it is incorporated as Arzamassky Municipal District. It is located in the southern central part of the oblast. The area of the district is 2,016.9 square kilometers (778.7 sq mi). Its administrative center is the city of Arzamas (which is not administratively a part of the district). Population: 43,723 (2010 Census); 46,086 (2002 census); 54,491 (1989 Soviet census).

== History ==
The district was established in 1929.

== Administrative and municipal status ==
Within the framework of administrative divisions, Arzamassky District is one of the forty in the oblast. The city of Arzamas serves as its administrative center, despite being incorporated separately as a city of oblast significance—an administrative unit with the status equal to that of the districts.

As a municipal division, the district is incorporated as Arzamassky Municipal District. The city of oblast significance of Arzamas is incorporated separately from the district as Arzamas Urban Okrug.

== Transportation ==
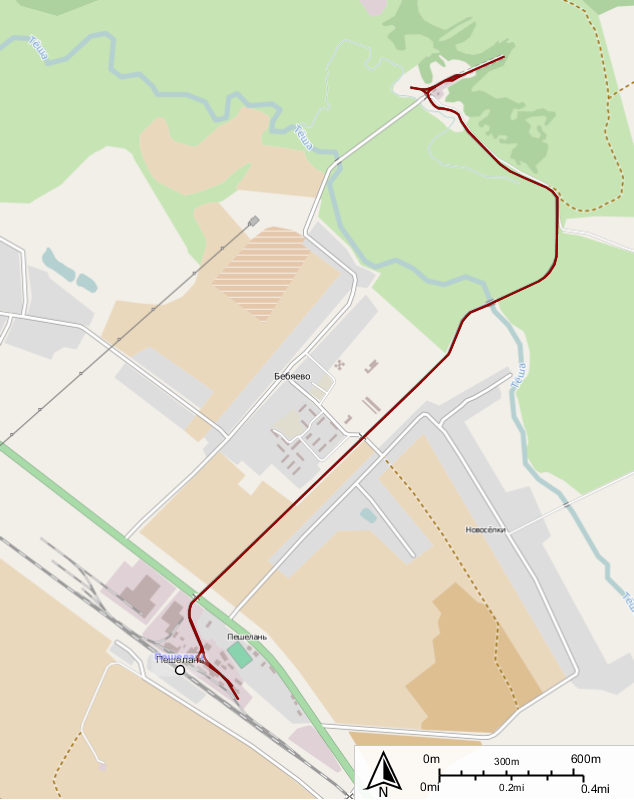
Map of Peshelan narrow gauge railway

A narrow gauge railway serving the Peshelan gypsum mine is located in the village of Bebyayevo.

== Notable residents ==
- Alena Arzamasskaia (died 1670), famed female rebel fighter, born in Vyezdnaya
- Valentina Telichkina (born 1945), actress, born in the village of Krasnoye
