= Nizhny Novgorod Oblast =

First-level administrative division of Russia

Nizhny Novgorod Oblast Нижегородская область (Russian)
- Oblast
- Flag Coat of arms

- Coordinates: 56°29′N 44°32′E
- Country: Russia
- Federal district: Volga
- Economic region: Volga-Vyatka
- Established: January 14, 1929 (first), December 5, 1936 (second)
- Administrative center: Nizhny Novgorod

Government
  - Body: Legislative Assembly
  - Governor: Gleb Nikitin

Area
  - Total: 76,624 km^{2} (29,585 sq mi)
  - Rank: 40th

Population (2021 census)
  - Total: 3,119,115 ▼
  - Estimate (2018): 3,234,752
  - Rank: 12th
  - Density: 40.707/km^{2} (105.43/sq mi)
  - Urban: 79.9%
  - Rural: 20.1%

GDP (nominal, 2024)
  - Total: ₽3.08 trillion (US$36.14 billion)
  - Per capita: ₽1.01 million (US$11,850.53)
- Time zone: UTC+3 (MSK)
- ISO 3166 code: RU-NIZ
- License plates: 52, 152, 252
- OKTMO ID: 22000000
- Official languages: Russian
- Website: http://www.government-nnov.ru/

Nizhny Novgorod Oblast (Russian: Нижегоро́дская о́бласть, romanized: Nizhegorodskaya oblastʹ) is a federal subject of Russia (an oblast). Its administrative center and largest city is the city of Nizhny Novgorod. It has a population of 3,119,115 as of the 2021 Census. From 1932 to 1990, it was known as Gorky Oblast. (Note: Russian: Горьковская область)

The oblast is crossed by the Volga River. Apart from Nizhny Novgorod's metropolitan area (including Dzerzhinsk, Bor and Kstovo) the biggest city is Arzamas. Near the town of Sarov there is the Serafimo-Diveyevsky Monastery, one of the largest convents in Russia, established by Saint Seraphim of Sarov. The Makaryev Monastery opposite of the town of Lyskovo used to be the location of the largest fair in Eastern Europe. Other historic towns include Gorodets and Balakhna, located on the Volga to the north from Nizhny Novgorod.

== Geography ==
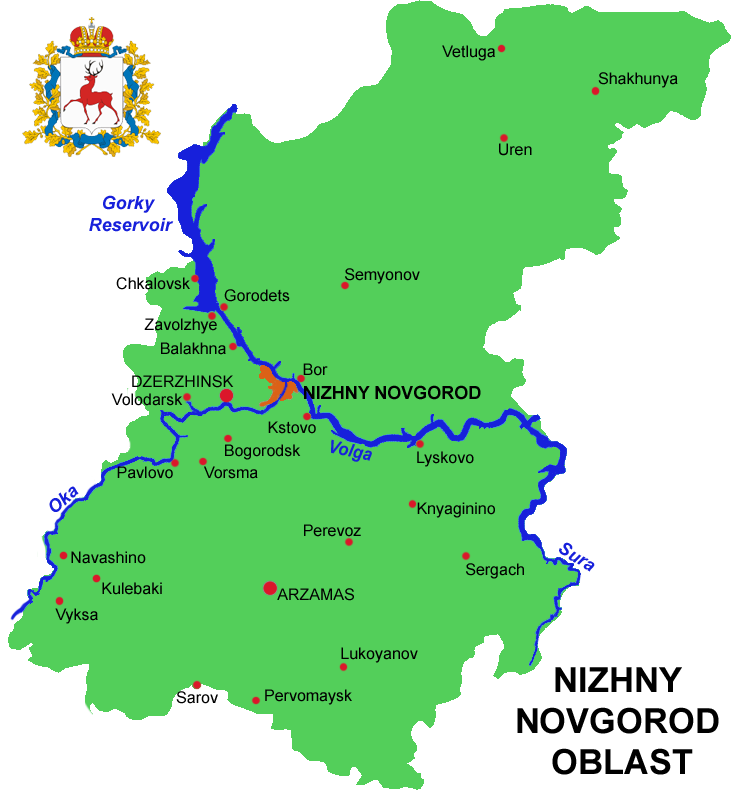
Map of Nizhny Novgorod Oblast

The oblast covers an area of 76,900 square kilometers (29,700 sq mi). Agricultural land occupies 41% of this area; forests, 48%, lakes and rivers, 2%; and other lands, 9%. Nizhny Novgorod Oblast borders Kostroma Oblast (N), Kirov Oblast (NE), the Mari El Republic (E), the Chuvash Republic (E), the Republic of Mordovia (S), Ryazan Oblast (SW), Vladimir Oblast (W), and Ivanovo Oblast (NW).

=== Natural resources ===
Nizhny Novgorod Oblast is not rich in natural resources, which are limited to commercial deposits of sand (including titanium-zirconium sands), clay, gypsum, peat, mineral salt, and timber.

== History ==
The sites of Pustyn I and the settlement of Naumovka I, Krasny Bor 5 and others belong to the Mesolithic era in the Nizhny Novgorod region. Burial grounds of the Fatyanovo culture of the Bronze Age were found in the Chkalovsky, Vetluzhsky and Krasnobakovsky districts.

In the course of the regional reform of Peter I in 1708, Nizhny Novgorod with the surrounding lands was added to the Kazan Governorate. In 1714, the Nizhny Novgorod Governorate was created.

On January 14, 1929, the Nizhny Novgorod Oblast was formed. On July 15 of the same year, it was transformed into the Nizhny Novgorod Territory.

On October 7, 1932, the Nizhny Novgorod Territory was renamed the Gorky Territory (in honor of the writer Maxim Gorky). On December 5, 1936, the Gorky Territory was transformed into the Gorky Oblast (the Mari and Chuvash Republics were taken from the former territory).

On January 7, 1954, the Arzamas Oblast was separated from the Gorky Oblast. On April 23, 1957, the Arzamas Oblast was abolished, and its territory was returned to the Gorky Oblast.

On October 22, 1990, by the Decree of the Presidium of the Supreme Soviet of the RSFSR, the Gorky Oblast was renamed the Nizhny Novgorod Oblast. On April 21, 1992, the Congress of People's Deputies of Russia approved the decision of the presidium of the parliament to rename the region, amending Art. 71 of the Constitution of the RSFSR of 1978, which entered into force on May 16, 1992.

== Politics ==
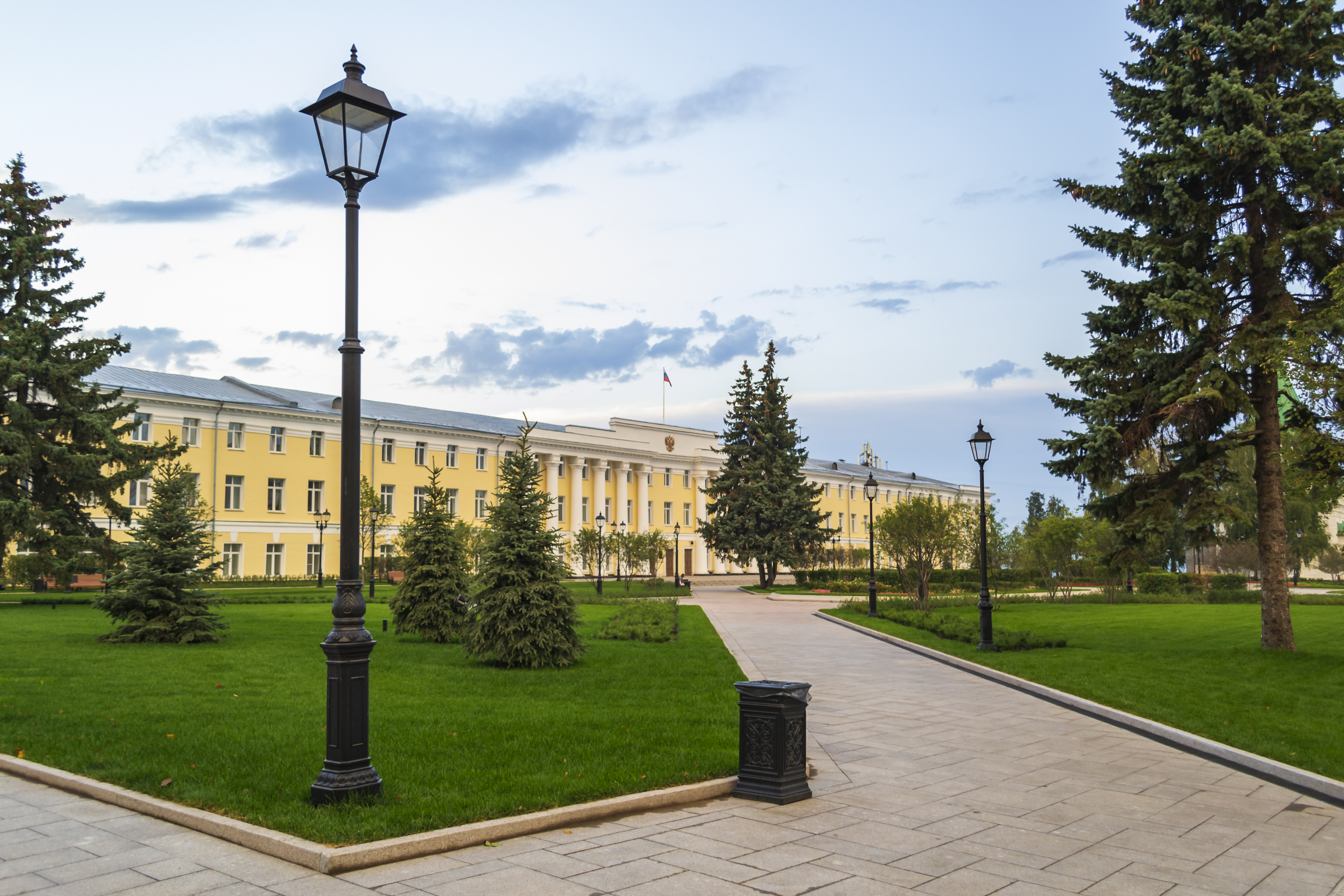
Nizhny Novgorod House of Legislative Assembly in the Nizhny Novgorod Kremlin, 2013

During the Soviet period, the high authority in the oblast was shared between three persons: the first secretary of the Nizhny Novgorod (then Gorki) CPSU Committee (who in reality had the greatest authority); the chairman of the oblast Soviet (legislative power); and the chairman of the oblast Executive Committee (executive power). After the abolition of Article 6 of the Constitution of the USSR in March 1990, the CPSU lost its monopoly on power. The head of the Oblast administration, and eventually the governor, was appointed/elected alongside the elected regional parliament.

The Charter of Nizhny Novgorod Oblast is the fundamental law of the region. The Legislative Assembly of Nizhny Novgorod Oblast is the province's standing legislative (representative) body. The Legislative Assembly exercises its authority by passing laws, resolutions, and other legal acts and by supervising the implementation and observance of the laws and other legal acts passed by it. The highest executive body is the Oblast Government, which includes territorial executive bodies such as district administrations, committees, and commissions that facilitate development and run the day to day matters of the province. The Oblast administration supports the activities of the Governor who is the highest official and acts as guarantor of the observance of the oblast Charter in accordance with the Constitution of Russia.

== Sights ==
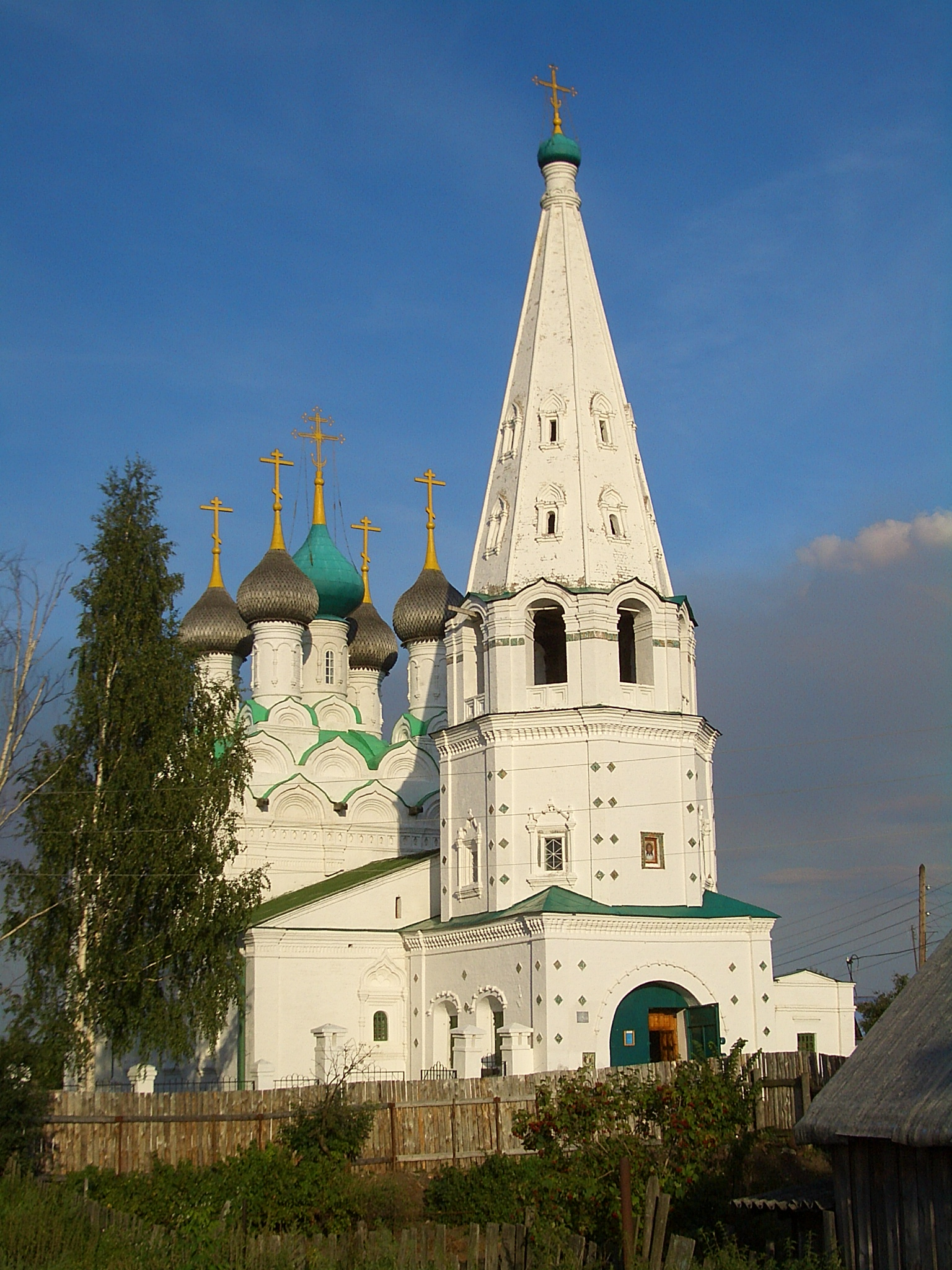
Savior's Church in Balakhna

The unique architectural construction—the 128-meter (420 ft) steel lattice hyperboloid tower built by the Russian engineer and scientist Vladimir Grigorievich Shukhov in 1929—is located near the town of Dzerzhinsk on the left bank of the Oka River.

== Demographics ==
Historical population
Year	Pop.	±%
1897	1,584,774	—
1926	2,743,344	+73.1%
1939	3,565,000	+30.0%
1959	3,590,274	+0.7%
1970	3,682,484	+2.6%
1979	3,695,523	+0.4%
1989	3,714,322	+0.5%
2002	3,524,028	−5.1%
2010	3,310,597	−6.1%
2021	3,119,115	−5.8%
2025	3,037,816	−2.6%
Source: Census data, estimate

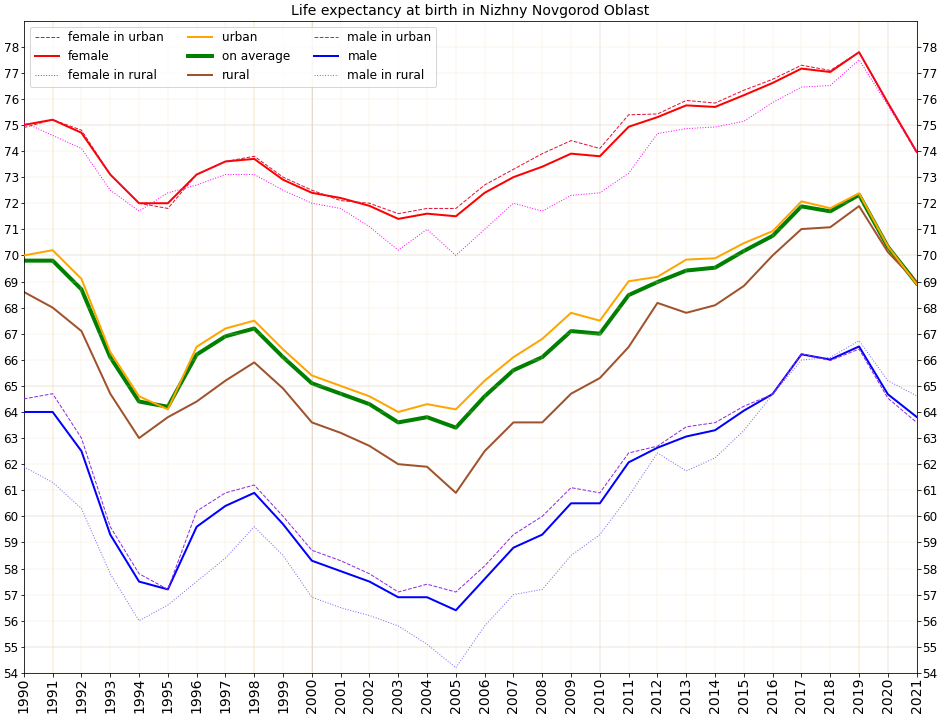
Life expectancy at birth in Nizhny Novgorod Oblast

According to the 2010 Census, ethnic Russians at 3,109,661 made up 95.1% of the oblast's population. Other ethnic groups included Tatars (44,103, or 1.4%), Mordva (19,138, or 0.6%), Ukrainians (17,657, or 0.5%), and various smaller groups, each accounting for less than 0.5% of the total. Additionally, 42,349 people were registered from administrative databases, and could not declare an ethnicity. It is estimated that the proportion of ethnicities in this group is the same as that of the declared group.

Vital statistics for 2024:

- Births: 21,995 (7.2 per 1,000)
- Deaths: 45,371 (14.9 per 1,000)

Total fertility rate (2024):
1.28 children per woman

Life expectancy (2021):
Total — 68.93 years (male — 63.81, female — 73.97)

According to the Federal Migration Service, 20,450 foreign citizens were registered in the oblast in 2006. The actual number of foreigners residing in the oblast as of June 1, 2006 was estimated to be over 22,000.

Religion

Religion in Nizhny Novgorod Oblast as of 2012 (Sreda Arena Atlas)
Russian Orthodoxy	69.2%
Other Orthodox	1.6%
Other Christians	2.1%
Rodnovery and other native faiths	0.7%
Spiritual but not religious	15.2%
Atheism and irreligion	10%
Other and undeclared	1.2%

According to a 2012 survey 69.2% of the population of Nizhny Novgorod Oblast adheres to the Russian Orthodox Church, 2% are unaffiliated generic Christians, 2% are Orthodox Christian believers without belonging to any church or members of other Orthodox churches, and 1% are adherents of the Slavic native faith (Rodnovery). In addition, 15% of the population declares to be "spiritual but not religious", 10% is atheist, and 0.8% follows other religions or did not give an answer to the question.

== Economy ==
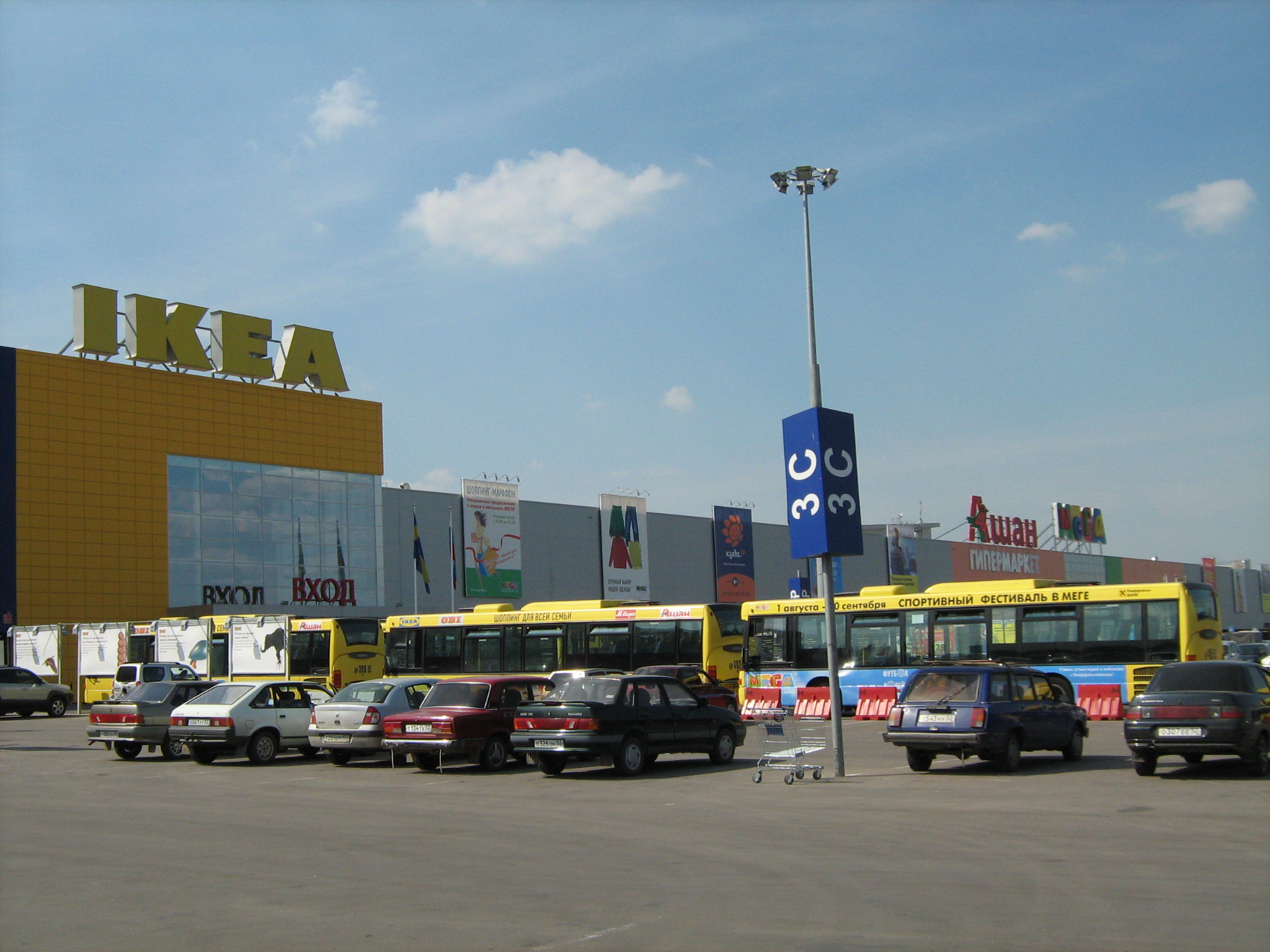
An IKEA shopping center in Fedyakovo.

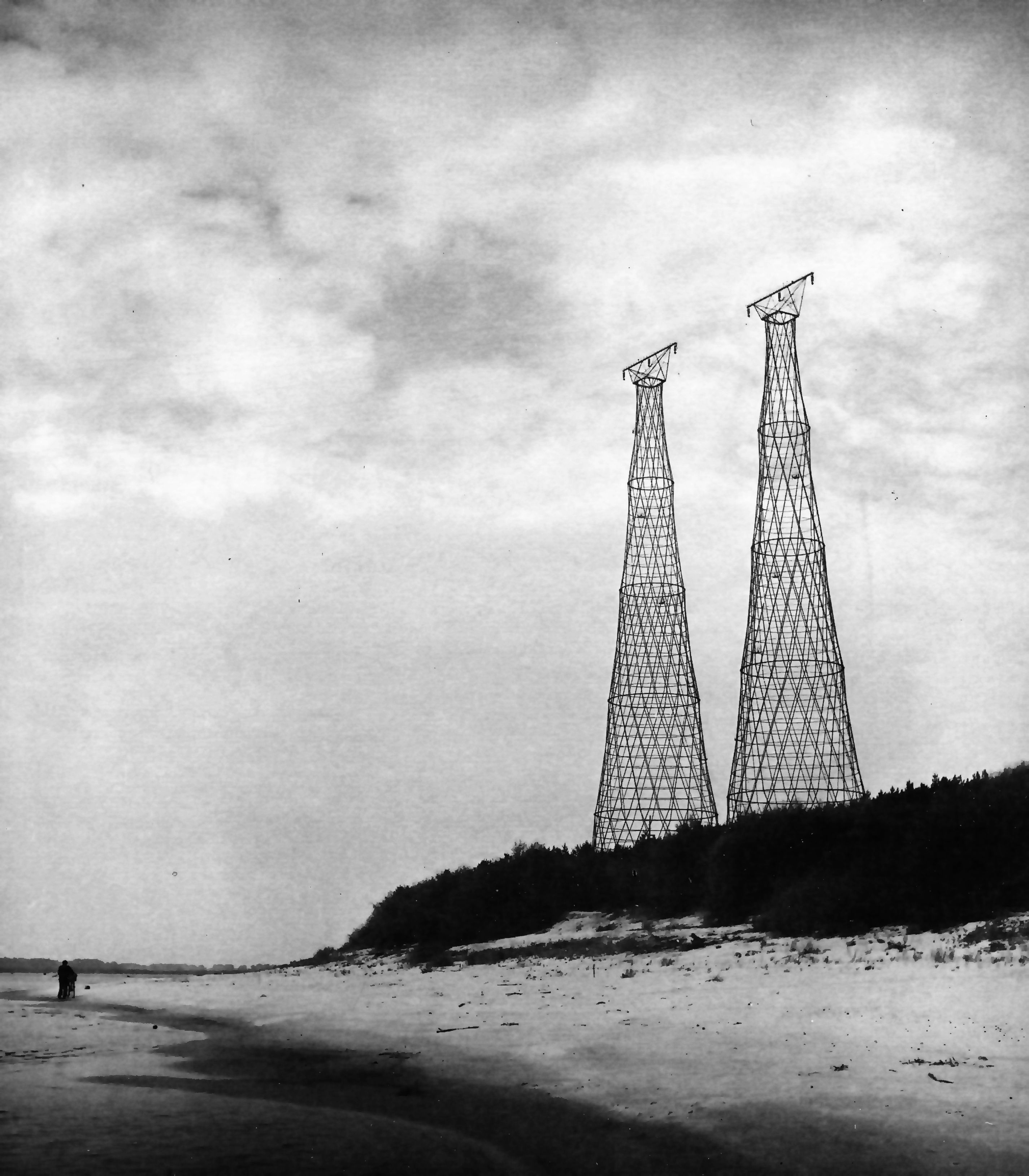
Shukhov towers built in Nizhny Novgorod suburbs near Dzerzhinsk in 1927–1929

The oblast ranks seventh in Russia in industrial output. Processing industries predominate in the local economy. More than 650 industrial companies employ nearly 700,000 people, or 62% of the workforce involved in material production. Industry generates 83% of the regional GDP and accounts for 89% of all material expenditures. The leading sectors are engineering and metalworking, followed by chemical and petrochemical industries and forestry, woodworking, and paper industries. The first three sectors account for about 75% of all industrial production.

The oblast has traditionally been attractive to investors. In 2002, Moody's rating agency confirmed a Caa1rating based on the region's long-term foreign currency liabilities.

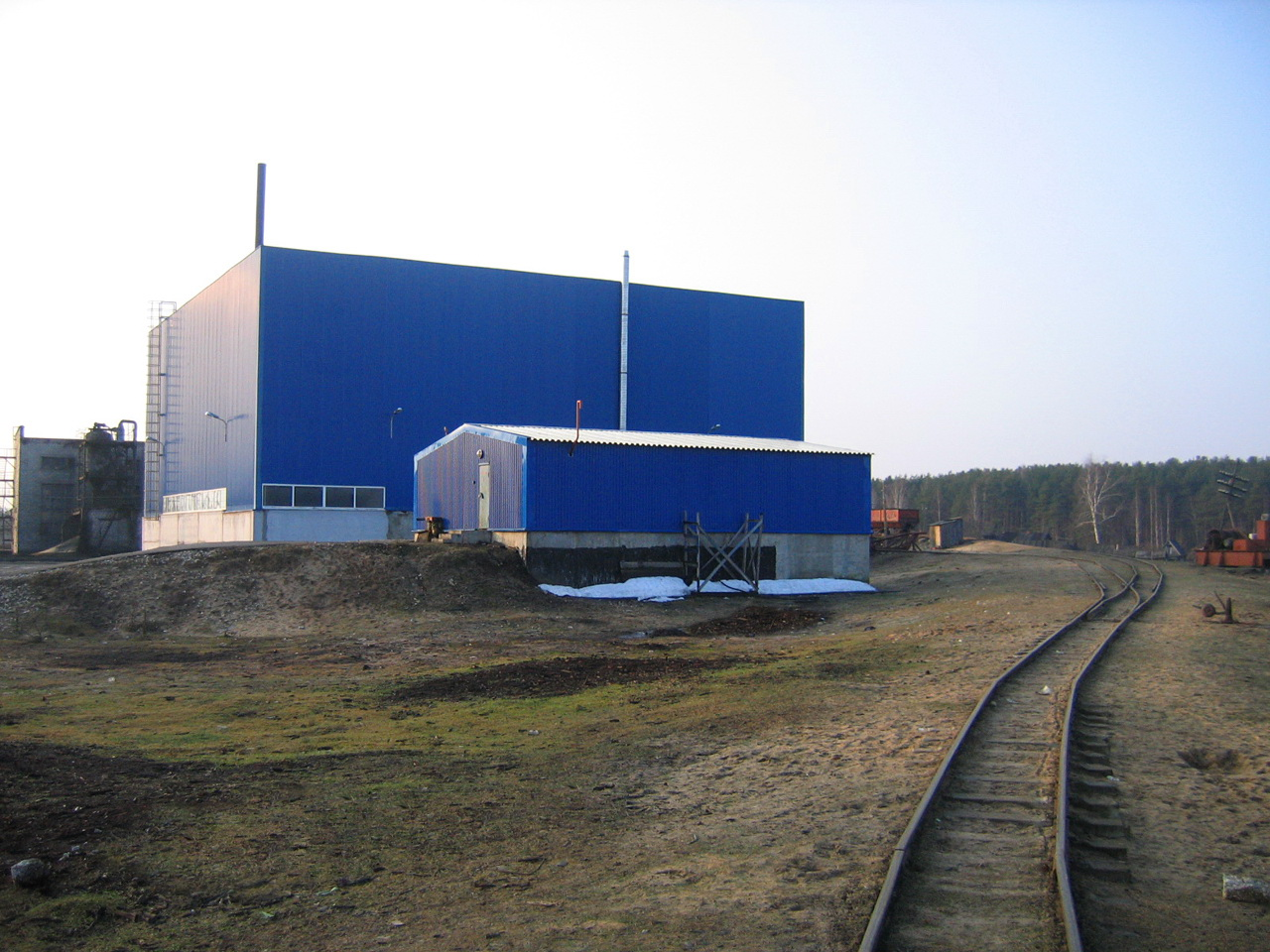
Peat Briquette Factory

The region maintains trade relations with many countries and has an export surplus. The largest volume of exports goes to Ukraine, Belarus, Switzerland, Kazakhstan, Belgium, and France. Imports come mainly from Ukraine, Germany, Belarus, Kazakhstan, Austria, Netherlands, China, and the United States.

The stock market infrastructure is quite well developed in Nizhny Novgorod, and the exchange business is expanding. Companies and organizations registered in the region include 1153 joint-stock companies, 63 investment institutions, 34 commercial banks, 35 insurance companies, 1 voucher investment fund, 1 investment fund, 17 nongovernmental pension funds, 2 associations of professional stock market dealers, and 3 exchanges (stock, currency, and agricultural).

There are 650+ industrial companies in the region, most of them engaged in the following sectors:

- Machine-building and engineering
- Chemical & petrochemical
- Fuel & energy
- Ferrous and non-ferrous metallurgy
- Construction materials
- Glass
- Wood and paper
- Cloth-making
- Food & food processing
- Medical & pharmaceuticals
- Printing & publishing.
- Peat extraction.

These key industries are supplemented by other sectors of the economy such as agriculture, trade, services, communications and transport.

=== Transportation ===
- The Altsevo peat narrow gauge railway is located in the work settlement of Pizhma
- The Pizhemskaya narrow gauge railway is located in the work settlement of Pizhma
- The narrow gauge railway of Caprolactam factory is located in Dzerzhinsk
- The Kerzhenets peat narrow gauge railway is located in the Borsky District
- The narrow gauge railway of Decor-1 factory is located in the Arzamassky District

Narrow gauge railways in the region:

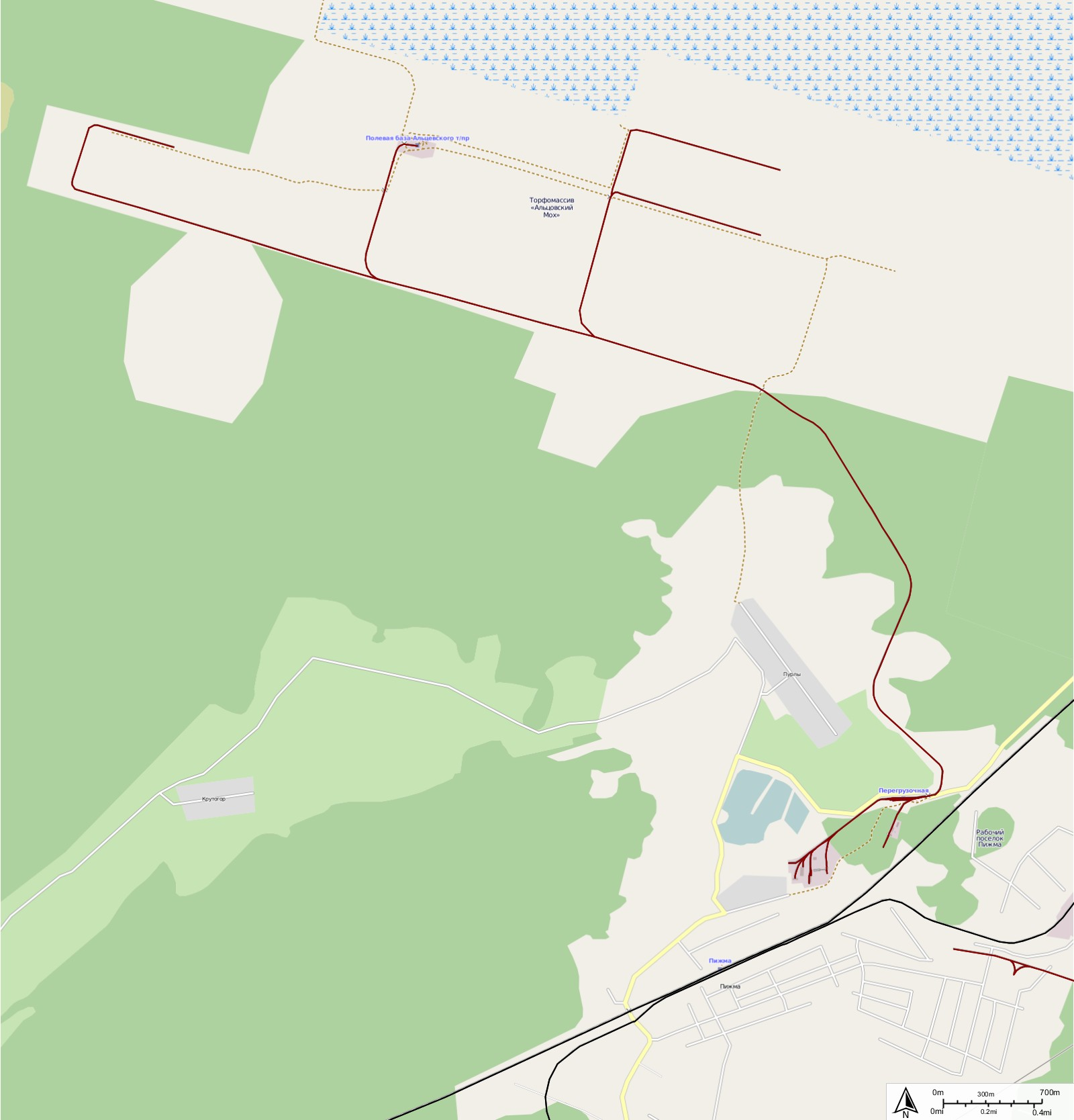
Map Altsevo peat narrow gauge railway

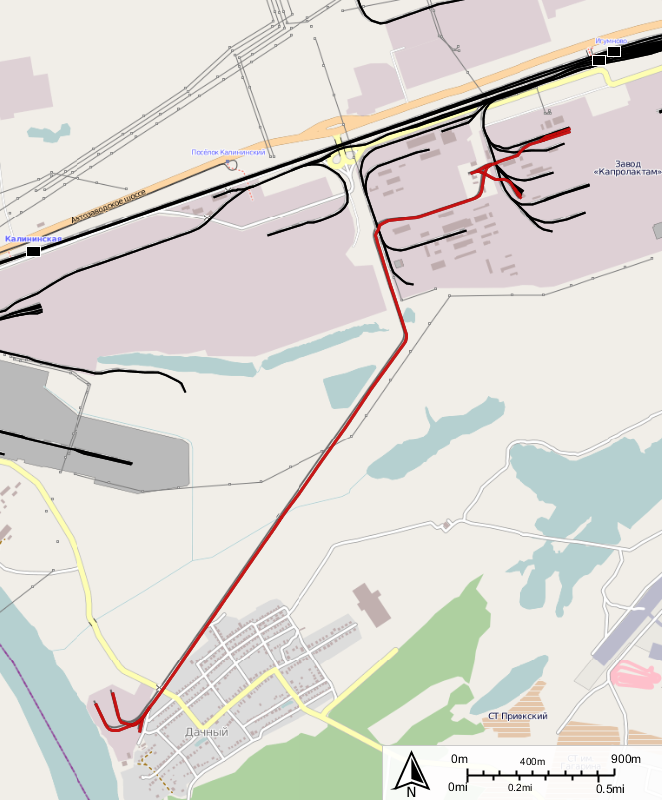
Map Narrow gauge railway of Caprolactam factory

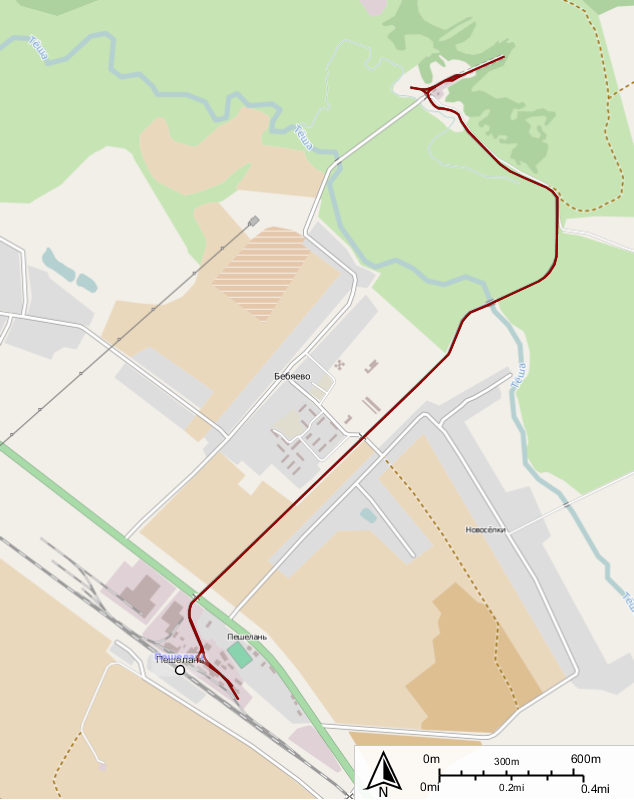
Map Narrow gauge railway of Decor-1 factory

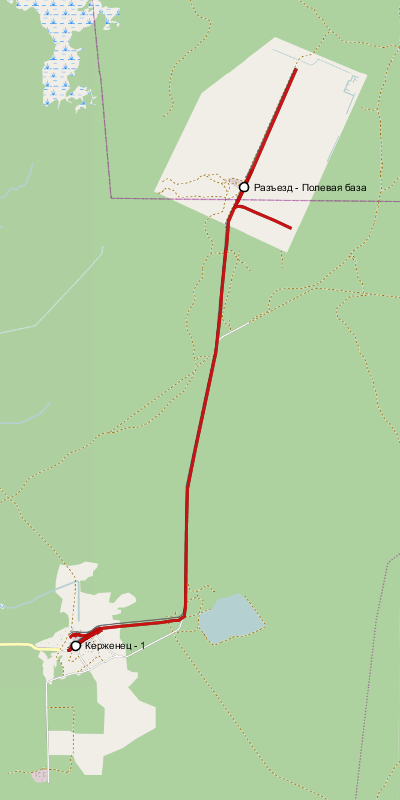
Map Kerzhenets peat narrow gauge railway
