= Newspaper Readers in Naples =

1831 painting by Orest Kiprensky

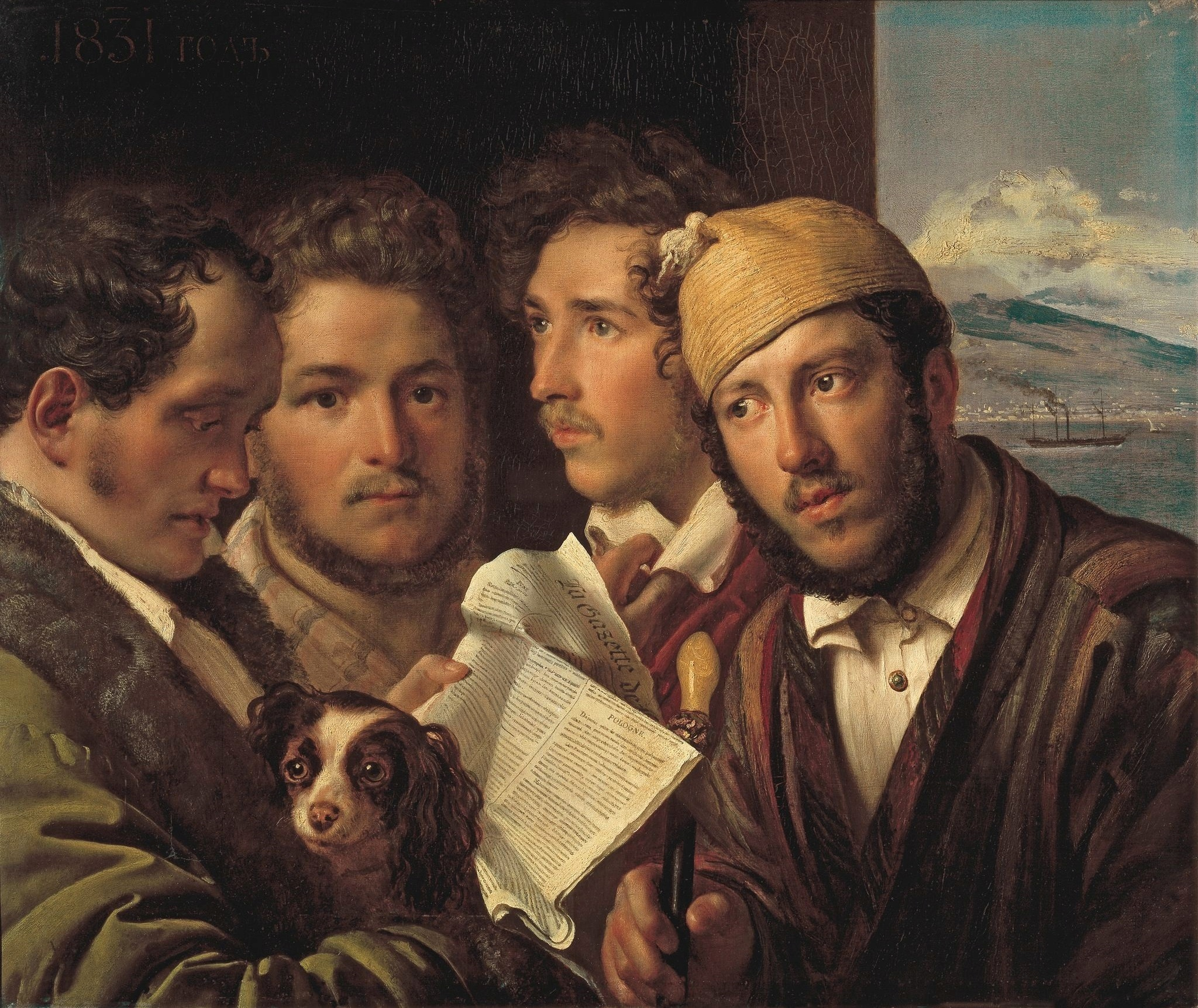
- Artist: Orest Kiprensky
- Year: 1831
- Medium: Oil on canvas
- Dimensions: 64,5 cm × 78,3 cm (254 in × 308 in)
- Location: Tretyakov Gallery, Moscow

Newspaper Readers in Naples is a painting by the Russian artist Orest Kiprensky (1782–1836), painted in 1831. It belongs to the State Tretyakov Gallery (inv. 5100). The size of the painting is 64.5 × 78.3 cm. It is titled Readers of Newspaper, Newspaper Readers in Italy, Reading a Newspaper, Travelers Reading the Gazette de France and others. The painting is a group portrait of four men, one reading a newspaper and the others listening. The nationality of the figures in the painting has been interpreted differently by various researchers of Kiprensky's work: they have been called either Russian or Polish.

The painting was created by Kiprensky in 1831 in Naples, commissioned by Count Dmitri Sheremetev. In 1832 the canvas was exhibited in Rome, and in 1833 it was presented at the exhibition of the Imperial Academy of Arts in St. Petersburg. In general, the painting was a success: the president of the Academy of Arts, Alexey Olenin, wrote to Kiprensky that his works, "and especially Travelers, delighted the spectators, whose flock was extraordinary". The painting was part of the collection of Dmitry Sheremetev, and then — of Feodor Pryanishnikov. In 1867 it came to the collection of the Rumyantsev Museum and in 1925 to the Tretyakov Gallery.

Art historian Dmitry Sarabyanov noted the "genre connotation" of Newspaper Readers in Naples and considered the essential advantage of the fact that the images of the people depicted in the painting are "treated truthfully, without embellishments," and the plot chosen by Kiprensky "does not provoke that sentimental idealization that is so typical of his later 'Italian genres'". For the Russian Museum chief curator Yevgeniya Petrova, the canvas is more than just a group portrait because "the theme is solved in a multifaceted way."

== History ==
=== Previous events and work on the painting ===
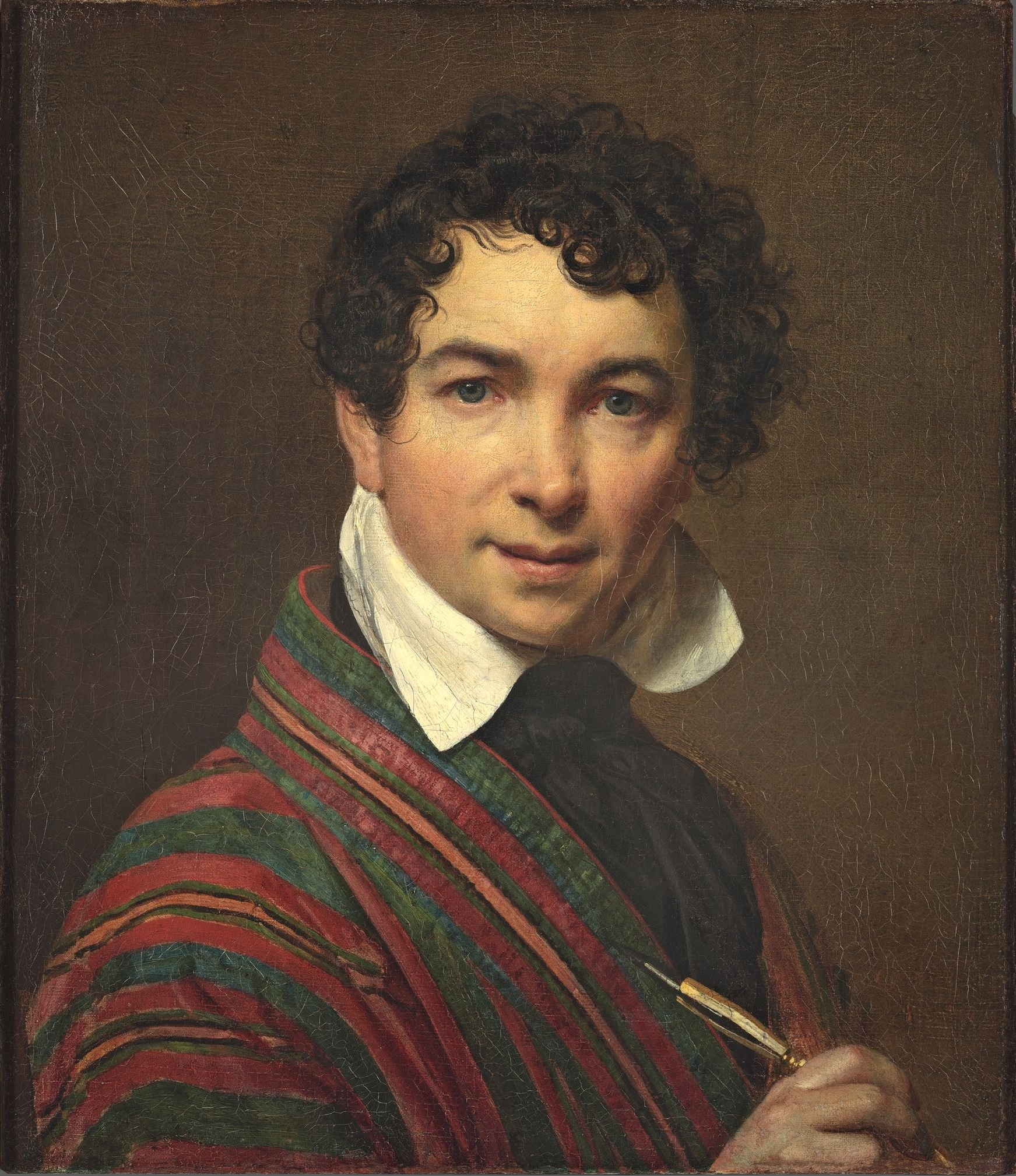
Kiprensky, Self-Portrait, 1828; Tretyakov Gallery, Moscow

Orest Kiprensky was a graduate of the Imperial Academy of Arts in 1803. In 1805, he received a large gold medal for the program "Dmitry Donskoy on the Victory over Mamai", which gave him the right to go abroad for three years. For some unknown reason he did not use this right and worked for several years in Russia — in St. Petersburg, Moscow and Tver. In May 1816 Kiprensky went abroad as a pensioner of the Empress Elisabeth Alexeyevna, where he first spent three months in Geneva and then, in October of the same year, arrived in Rome. The first Italian period of his work lasted until April 1822, when he left Rome for Paris, and then returned to Russia in August 1823.

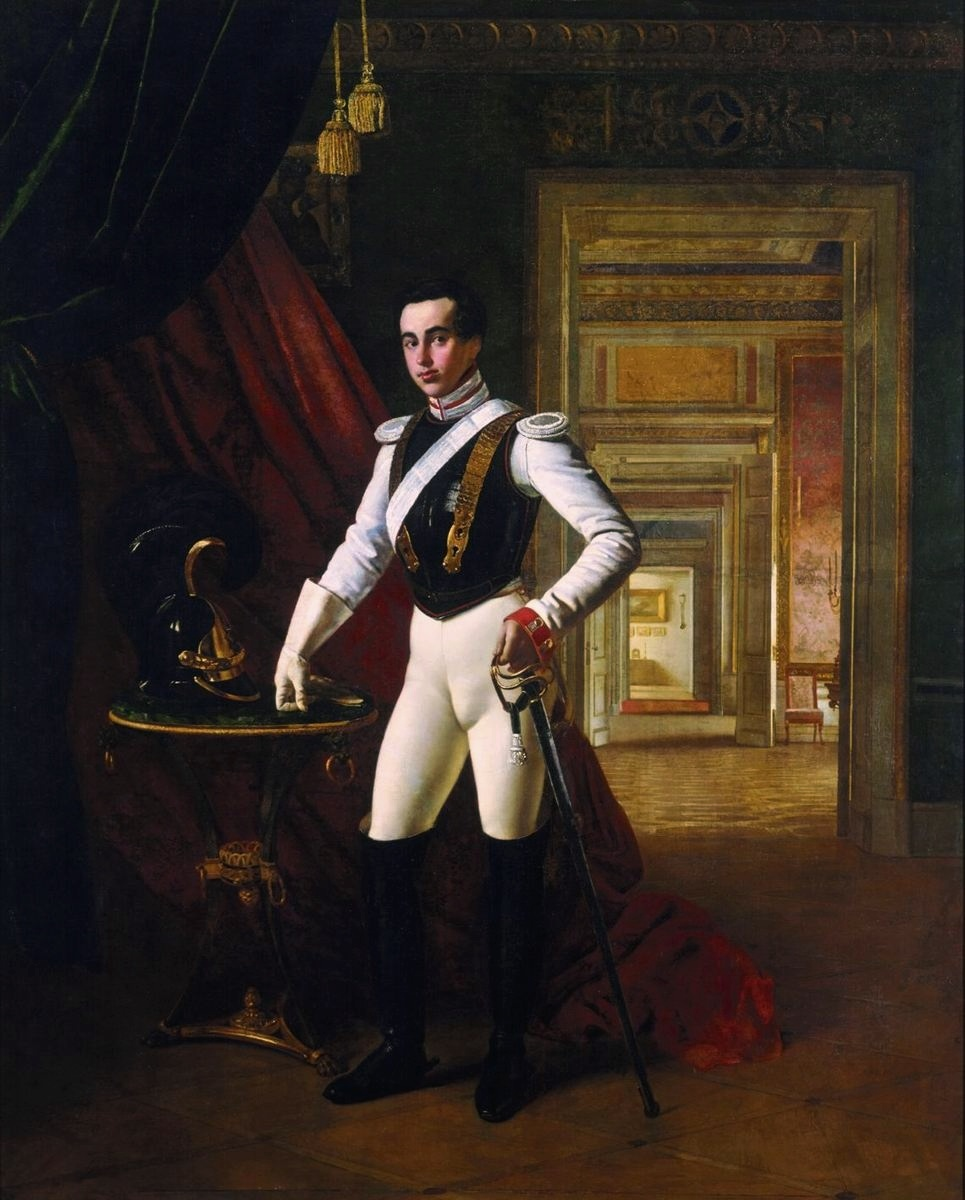
Kiprensky, Count Dmitry Sheremetev, 1824; State Historical Museum, Moscow

In St. Petersburg, Kiprensky rented an apartment on the English Embankment, but spent much of his time in the Fountain House, which belonged to his client and patron, the young cavalry officer Count Dmitri Sheremetev. In particular, the artist worked there on a large ceremonial portrait of Count Sheremetev, who was depicted in military uniform against the backdrop of an impressive enfilade of palace rooms. The canvas was presented at the Autumn Academic Exhibition of 1824 and became "the centerpiece of the exposition in the Kiprensky Hall". According to some reports, Kiprensky worked there, in the Fountain House, at the end of 1824 on a portrait drawing of Adam Mickiewicz, and in the summer of 1827 — on the renowned portrait of Alexander Pushkin, commissioned by Anton Delvig.

In June 1828 Kiprensky went to Italy again, on the way he was accompanied by a serf artist of Count Sheremetev Matvey Postnikov. From this time the second Italian period of Kiprensky's work began. Arriving in Italy, he first spent several months in Rome. From March 1829 to April 1832, Kiprensky lived and worked in Naples, where he settled in the same house with the landscape painter Sylvester Shchedrin. There, in Naples, in 1831, he also created the painting Newspaper Readers in Naples, which was commissioned by Count Dmitri Sheremetev.

=== Exhibitions in 1832 and 1833 ===
In 1832, the painting was exhibited in Rome, in the gallery in the Piazza del Popolo, where 18 works by Kiprensky were exhibited. Wishing to show his new works, including Newspaper readers in Naples, in Russia, the artist reported in a letter to Count Vasily Musin-Pushkin-Bruce dated February 13 (25), 1833: "Having the opportunity to send to St. Petersburg several paintings written by me in Naples, I kindly ask you, as President of the Imperial Society for the Encouragement of the Arts, to allow me to order to exhibit these works in the exposition hall, when they will be presented there; for I am very flattered to remind myself of the most honorable Russian public, always favored to my weak works". The paintings were sent to Russia - according to some reports, "Readers of Newspapers" arrived there under the title "Four Reading Artists".

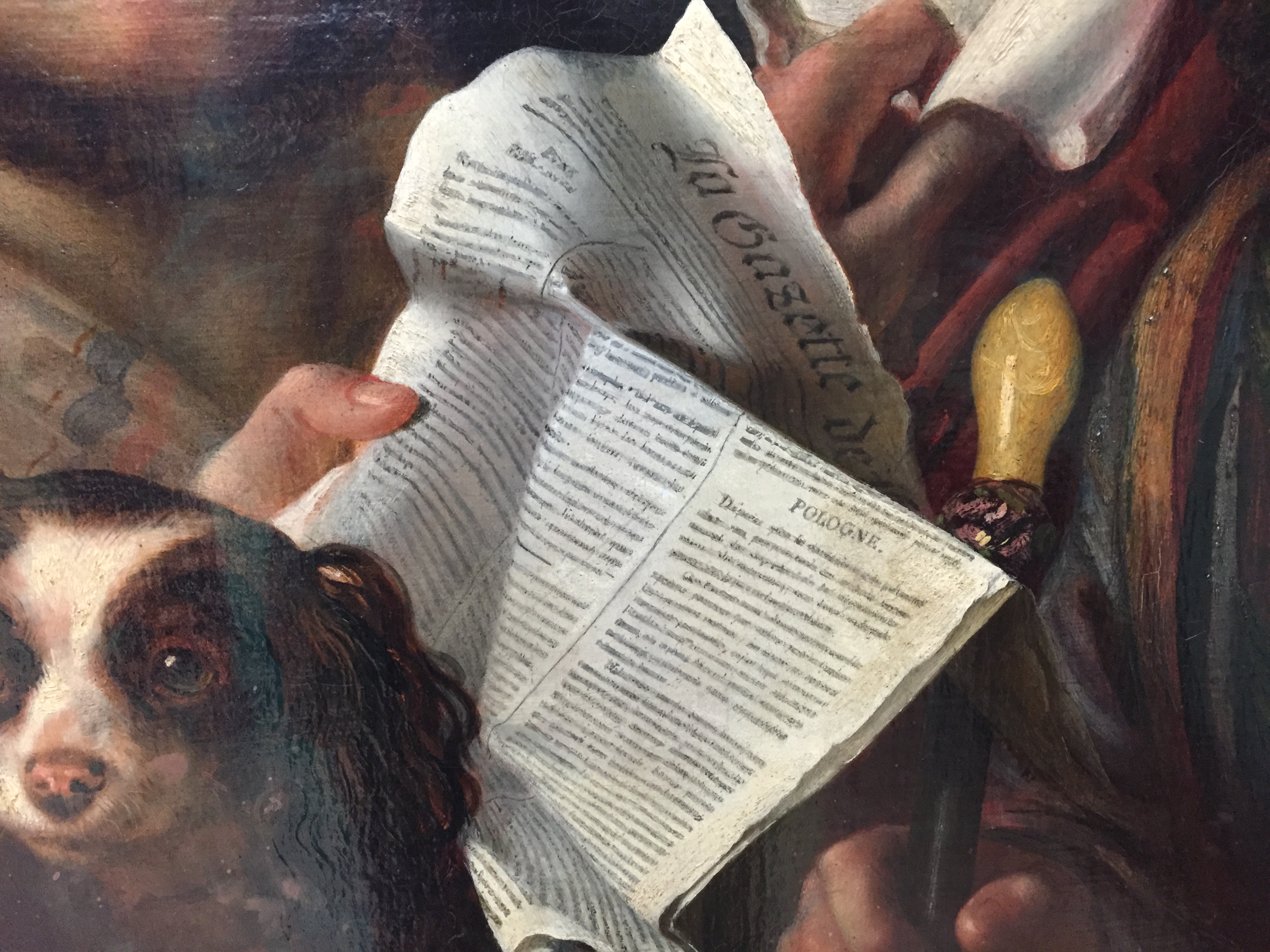
Newspaper with an article about Poland (picture detail)

In 1833, the canvas with the title Four Portraits, Belted Figures, One Reading a Newspaper and the Others Listening was presented at the exhibition of the Imperial Academy of Arts. A total of six of Kiprensky's works were exhibited at the exhibition, including, in addition to Newspaper Readers in Naples, the paintings Witch with a Candle, Lazzaroni Boy, Italian Woman with Fruit and View of Vesuvius from the Sea. The St. Petersburg exhibition aroused great interest, and a number of articles appeared in the press discussing the paintings presented at the exhibition, including Kiprensky's works. In the articles of a number of anonymous authors, as well as critics such as Alexander Voeykov and Mikhail Lobanov, among others, the canvas Newspaper Readers in Naples was discussed, which appeared in their reviews under the titles Some Russians Reading a Newspaper, Political Readings in 1831, Russian Young Artists Reading a Newspaper, Travelers Reading the Gazette de France and others. In general, Kiprensky's painting was a success and, according to some reports, was even liked by Emperor Nicholas I.

In particular, the writer Mikhail Lobanov described the impression that the painting Newspaper Readers in Naples made on him during his visit to the exhibition: "I am not standing in front of portraits, of which I have seen many and very good ones, but in front of living faces, living people. <...> If, finally, despite the power of optical deception, it is necessary to say that these are portraits, then it is true: they are portraits, but such portraits that no one writes today, except Mr. Kiprensky. There is nothing to desire, — all desires are warned, — it remains only to wonder". In November 1833, the then president of the Academy of Arts, Alexey Olenin, wrote to Kiprensky that his paintings, including Travelers Reading the Gazette de France, decorated the academic exhibition. According to Olenin, "despite the fact that the exhibition was brilliant, numerous and rich with many works by Russian and foreign artists, your [Kiprensky's] paintings, and especially the travelers, delighted the audience, whose flock was extraordinary".

=== Next events ===
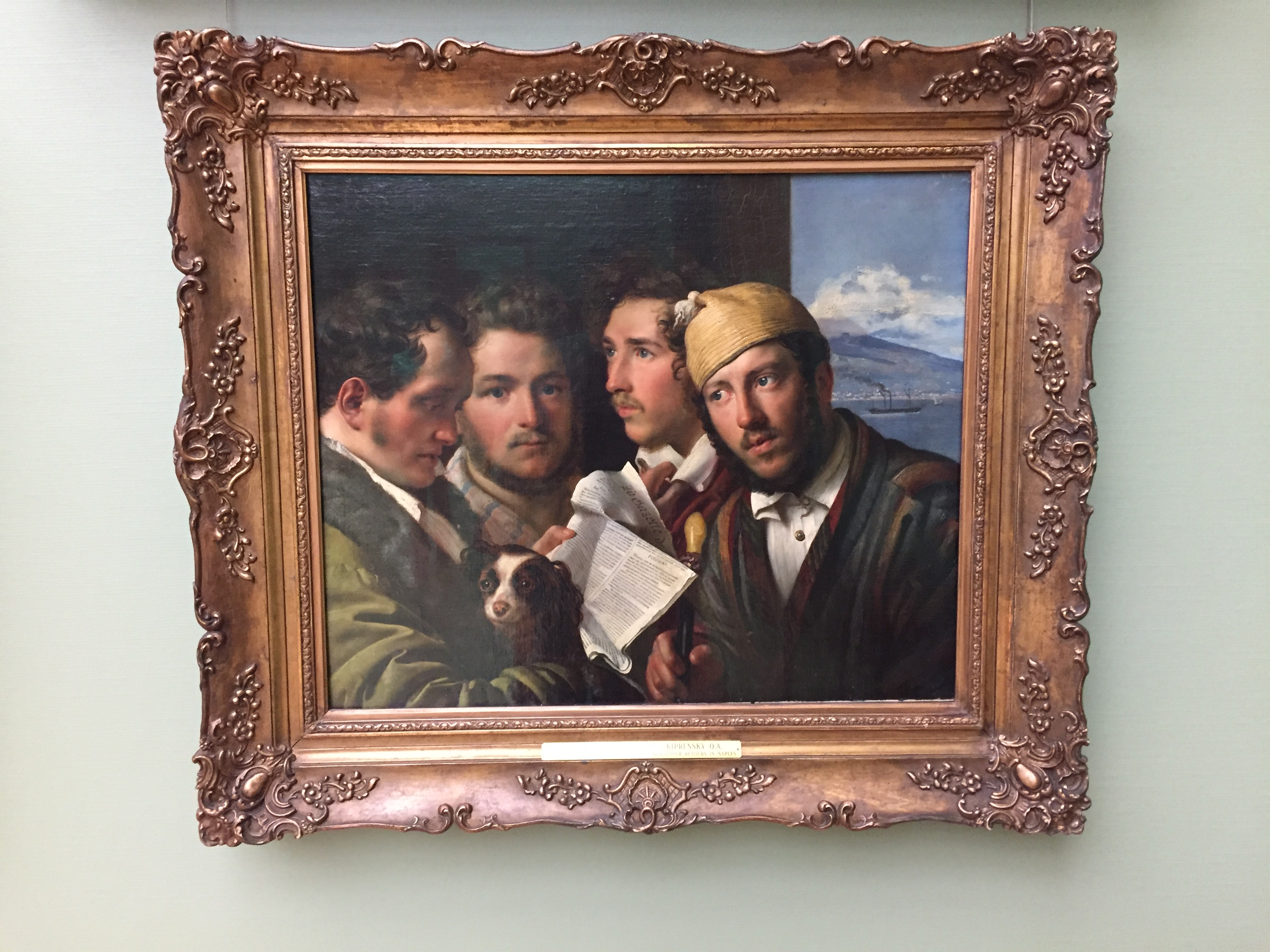
Newspaper Readers in Naples on display in the Tretyakov Gallery

In the spring of 1832, Kiprensky moved from Naples to Rome. The remuneration for the paintings Newspaper Readers in Naples and Worozheya with a Candle (1830, now in the State Russian Museum) sent to Count Dmitri Sheremetev (1830) was sent to the artist with delay, only in 1836; the total amount was 5490 rubles (according to other information 5940 or 6000 rubles). In a letter to the administrator of Count Sheremetev's estate, Alexander Kunitsyn, dated January 1835, Kiprensky wrote: "I ask you most kindly to explain to Count Dmitri Nikolaevich ... that I, loving him by inclination ... more than others, preferred him to others, dedicating the best works of his, which many of the lovers of fine art would like to have in their offices .... Working six with more than a month painting depicting reading a French newspaper and Vorozheyu Italian by candlelight ... [which] although brought the author of the general applause of the public and the sovereign himself, but from this is not easier for the author". While waiting for payment, Kiprensky wrote the following poems: "So time rolls on to summer, and I have no money, at least for the French newspaper, I would send me a coin" (under the pronoun "he" meant Count Sheremetev). Having saved enough money, in July 1836 Kiprensky realized his long-cherished dream — he married a young Italian Anna-Maria Falcucci, whom he knew from his first stay in Italy (he called her Mariuchcha). However, three months later, in October 1836, Kiprensky died of pneumonia.

The canvas "Newspaper Readers in Naples" was exhibited at the 1851 exhibition in St. Petersburg, where the shorter title Newspaper Readers was used. The works exhibited there were described in the Index of the Art Exhibition of Rare Things Owned by Private Persons. The painting belonged to the collection of Count Dmitry Sheremetev and later to Fyodor Pryanishnikov, whose collection included not only "Newspaper Readers" but also other paintings by Kiprensky — Sibylla Tiburtinskaya (1830, now in the State Tretyakov Gallery), Self-Portrait and Landscape. Shortly after Pryanishnikov's death in 1867, an exhibition of paintings from his collection was organized in the building of the Imperial Society for the Encouragement of the Arts in St. Petersburg, including Newspaper Readers in Naples. In the same year, 1867, Pryanishnikov's collection was purchased from his widow by Emperor Alexander II, who transferred it to the collection of the Rumyantsev Museum.

In Alexei Novitsky's essay The Art Gallery of the Moscow Public and Rumyantsev Museum, published in 1889, the canvas appeared under the title Newspaper Readers in Italy, and the description read: "Here are four portraits of Russian artists, life-size, at the waist. One, in a fur-lined robe, holding a dog, is reading a newspaper. The other three, also in robes, and one of them in a nightcap, listen to him with attention". In the 1908 catalogue of the Art Gallery of the Moscow State and Rumyantsev Museums, the canvas was also called Newspaper Readers in Italy, but the version about Russian artists was no longer mentioned. In 1925, after the dissolution of the Rumyantsev Museum, a significant part of Pryanishnikov's collection (95 paintings, including "Newspaper Readers in Naples") was transferred to the State Tretyakov Gallery.

Subsequently, the painting Newspaper Readers in Naples was exhibited at a number of exhibitions, including Kiprensky's personal exhibitions held in 1936 at the State Russian Museum in Leningrad and in 1938 at the State Tretyakov Gallery in Moscow, as well as at the jubilee exhibition dedicated to the 200th anniversary of the artist's birth, held in 1982–1983 in Leningrad, Moscow and Kyiv. In 1999, the canvas was included in the exhibition "The Birth of Time. The History of Images and Concepts" and in 2004–2005 at the exhibition "Russia — Italy. Through the Ages. From Giotto to Malevich" in Rome and Moscow (the Moscow part of the exhibition took place in the Pushkin State Museum of Fine Arts). In 2011–2012, the painting was included in the exhibition "'O dolce Napoli'. Naples through the eyes of Russian and Italian artists of the first half of the 19th century", held in the Engineering Building of the Tretyakov Gallery, and then in the Yaroslavl Art Museum and the Omsk Regional Museum of Fine Arts named after M. A. Vrubel. Kiprensky's canvas was also one of the exhibits in the exhibition "Dreams of Freedom. Romanticism in Russia and Germany", held from April to August 2021 at the New Tretyakovka in Krymsky Val and then from October 2021 to February 2022 at the Albertinum in Dresden.

== Description ==
The painting is a group portrait of four men, one of whom is reading a newspaper while the others listen. Kiprensky himself explained in a letter to Count Vasily Musin-Pushkin-Bruce dated February 13 (25), 1833, that this painting "...depicts political reading in 1831. I took the scene from everyday life. Russian travelers in Naples are reading La Gazette de France an article about Poland, as you can see in the picture. Pictures of these works of mine were sent to Count D. N. Sheremetev in gratitude". According to Alexei Novitsky, the artist painted the picture so carefully that "one can even read some parts of the newspaper". Although Kiprensky himself referred to the people in the painting as "Russians", some contemporaries believed that he did so to soften the political overtones associated with the Polish uprising of 1830, which was suppressed by the Russian army in 1831. For example, the painter Andrei Ivanov, in a letter to his son, the painter Alexander Ivanov, believed that the painting actually depicted "several persons of the Polish nation reading a newspaper" and considered their characters "true and peculiar to [this] nation".

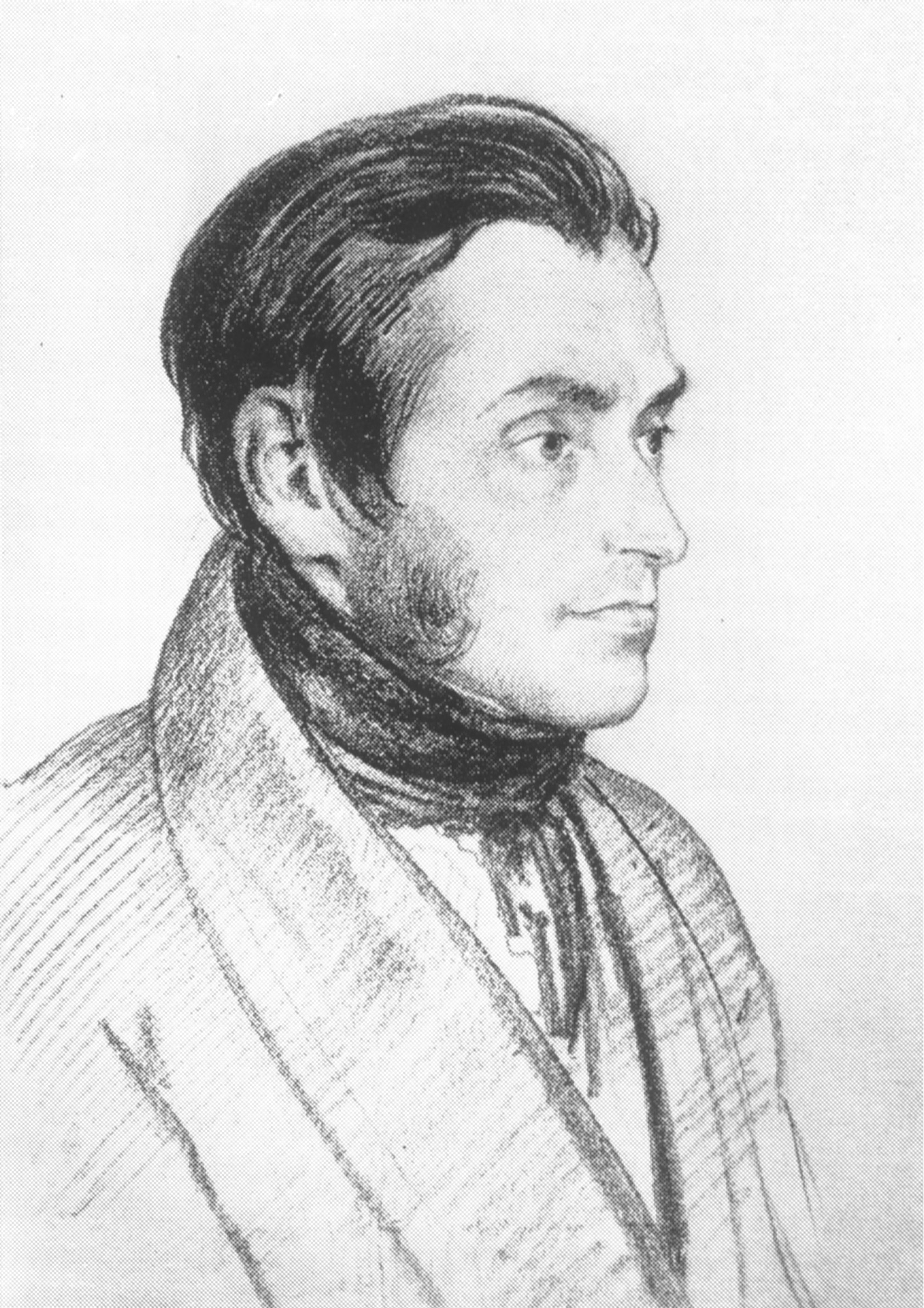
Kiprensky, Portrait of a Man, the so-called Adam Mickiewicz, c. 1824–1825, black chalk on paper; Tretyakov Gallery, Moscow

And in subsequent publications, the nationality of the figures in the painting was interpreted differently by different researchers of Kiprensky's work — they were called either Russian or Polish. On the one hand, art historian Dmitry Sarabianov, following the artist's own definition, saw them as "Russian travelers reading a message about events in Poland". One of the arguments in favor of this view was that the painting was intended for Count Dmitry Sheremetev, who "participated in the suppression of the Polish uprising and even received an award for it". On the other hand, the art historian Valery Turchin believed that Kiprensky's words about the painting were a deliberate joke and "confused the question of who is depicted in the painting 'Newspaper Readers', because the Poles —the heroes of the painting— were supposed to remain silent in Russia"

In the 1905 book about the Moscow Rumyantsev Gallery, in whose collection the painting Newspaper Readers in Naples was at that time, the art historian Nikolai Romanov suggested that the following representatives of the Polish colony in Italy were depicted on the canvas: from left to right — the poets Antoni Edward Odyniec, Adam Mickiewicz and Zygmunt Krasiński, and Count Alexander Potocki. The same information (with the caveat "it is possible to assume that...") was given in the 1908 edition of the Art Gallery catalog. According to another version, the order of the persons depicted in the painting is different: Potocki, Mickiewicz, Krasinski and Odyniec.

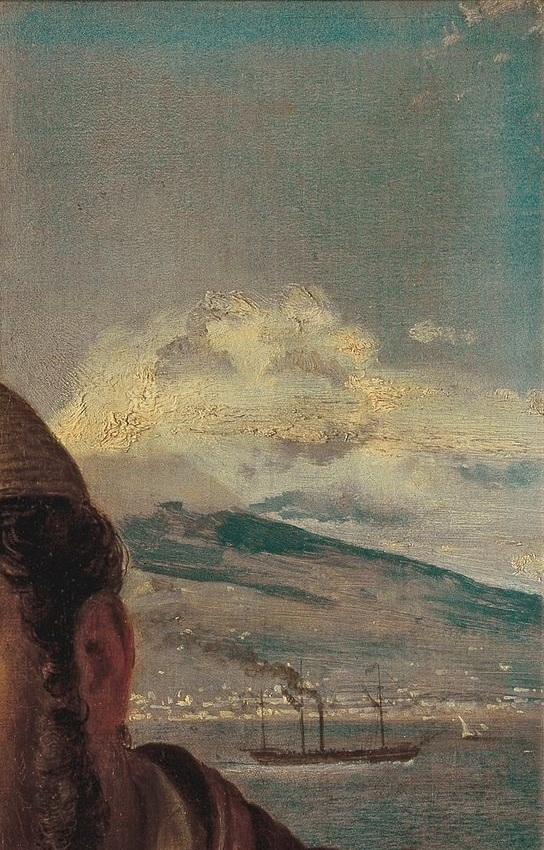
Landscape with Vesuvius (detail of painting)

It is known that Kiprensky was acquainted with Mickiewicz. Their first meeting seems to have taken place in St. Petersburg in late 1824 or early 1825: during this period, Kiprensky drew a pencil portrait of Mickiewicz in his sketchbook, which was long considered a Portrait of an Unknown and later attributed to Izolda Kislyakova. Kiprensky and Mickiewicz also met in Italy in 1829, two years before the creation of Newspaper Readers. It is known that Mickiewicz and Odyniec were in Italy in 1830 —among other things, they climbed Mount Vesuvius together and also visited the ruins of Pompeii. Mickiewicz also visited Italy in 1831— according to some speculations he might have been there together with Odynets and Krasinski, so it is possible that they really posed for Kiprensky's painting". An additional argument is the fact that in 1831 Sergei Sobolevsky reported to Stepan Shevyryov from Rome about the departure of Mickiewicz with his "oblique companion". It is known that Odynets suffered from strabismus — if he is the one on the left in the picture, Kiprensky successfully hid his physical defect by showing him sideways.

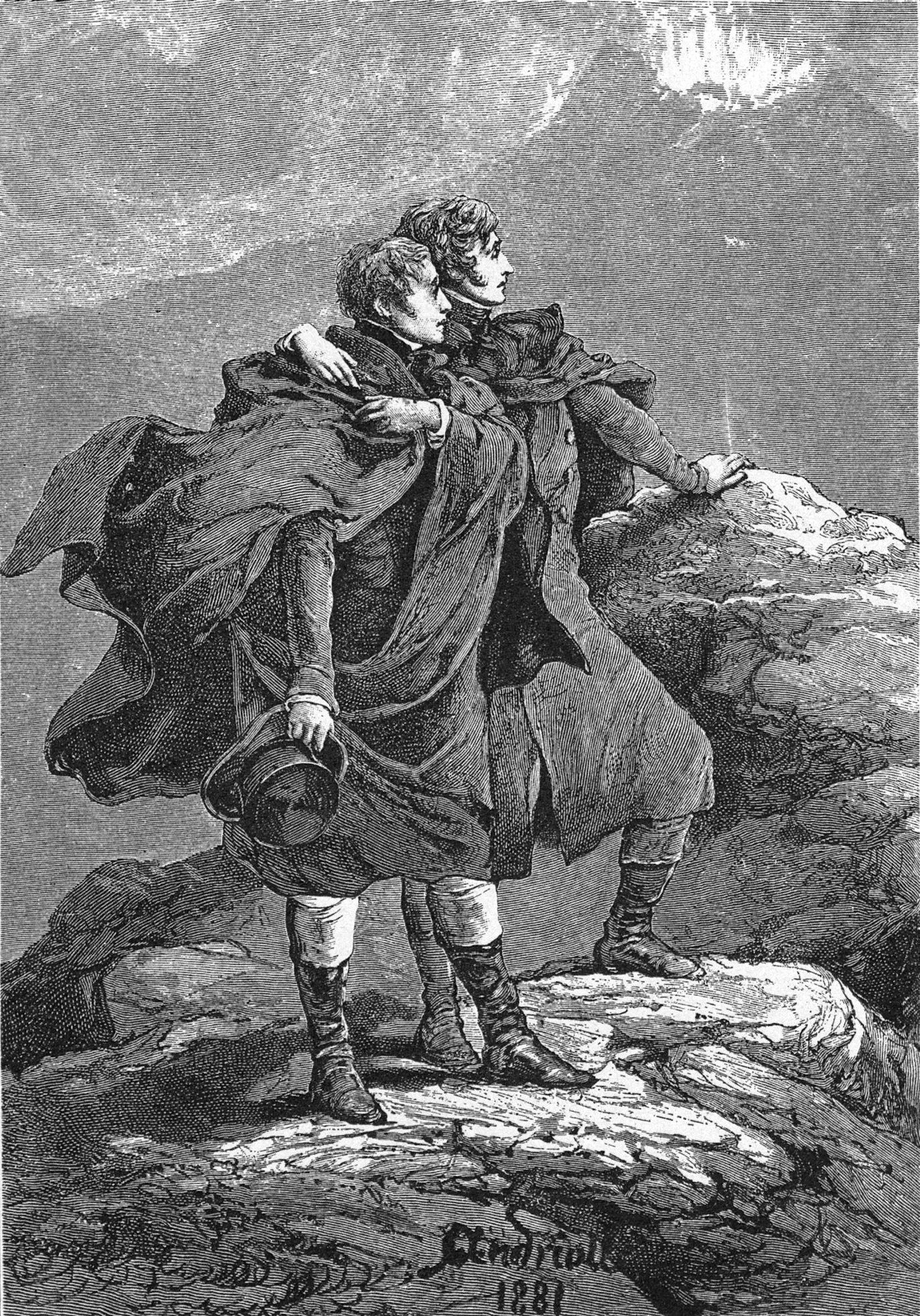
Michał Elwiro Andriolli, Adam Mickiewicz with Anthony Edward Odync on Vesuvius, 1881

According to the art historian Vera Chaikovskaya, the four men depicted in the painting "hardly resemble Russian travelers" in their appearance: their postures are too loose, their clothes resemble home dresses, one holds a small dog in his arms, on the head of another "a funny straw hat with a tassel" (Mikhail Lobanov called it 'kippah', and Alexei Novitsky — 'nightcap'). The newspaper readers are standing in front of a dark wall, in the opening of which (in the right part of the picture) one can see in the background a smoking volcano — Vesuvius, which was considered by Kiprensky's contemporaries to be a symbol of revolution. This detail gives an idea of the artist's social sympathies. In the upper left corner of the wall is the author's date — 1831.

== Reviews and critics ==
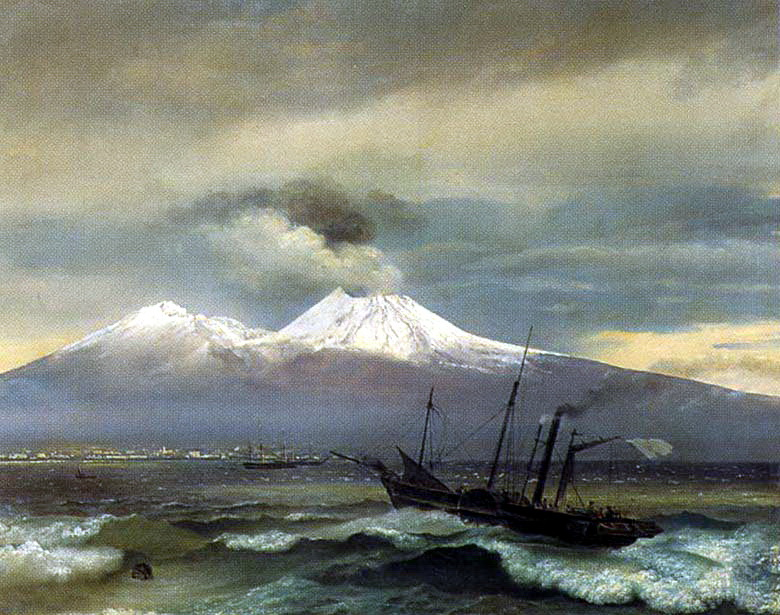
Kiprensky, View of Vesuvius in Winter Time, 1830; Peterhof Palace

Art historian Valery Turchin, discussing Kiprensky's work of the 1830s, believes that the artist continued to use preparatory sketches during this period. According to Turchin, this is particularly evident in the analysis of the canvas "Newspaper Readers in Naples," which reveals the composition of the painting from individual sketches, "due to the poor arrangement of which there is neither pictorial nor psychologically motivated connection between the depicted. Turchin also noted that Kiprensky apparently used a previously written landscape with a view of Mount Vesuvius as the background for the group portrait.

Art historian Dmitry Sarabianov noted the "genre elements" of the group portrait Newspaper Readers in Naples, while acknowledging that the dominant concept in Kiprensky's painting is portraiture, and "the beginning of genre is only hinted at." According to Sarabianov, the plot introduced by the artist "seems to counteract the fact that each character is revealed in his natural inner being", as a result of which "neither the possibilities of the genre nor the potency of portraiture remain unrealized in the painting". On the other hand, according to Sarabianov, a significant advantage is that the images of the people portrayed in the painting are "treated truthfully, without glossing over", and the subject chosen by the artist "does not provoke that sentimental idealization so typical of his later 'Italian genres'".

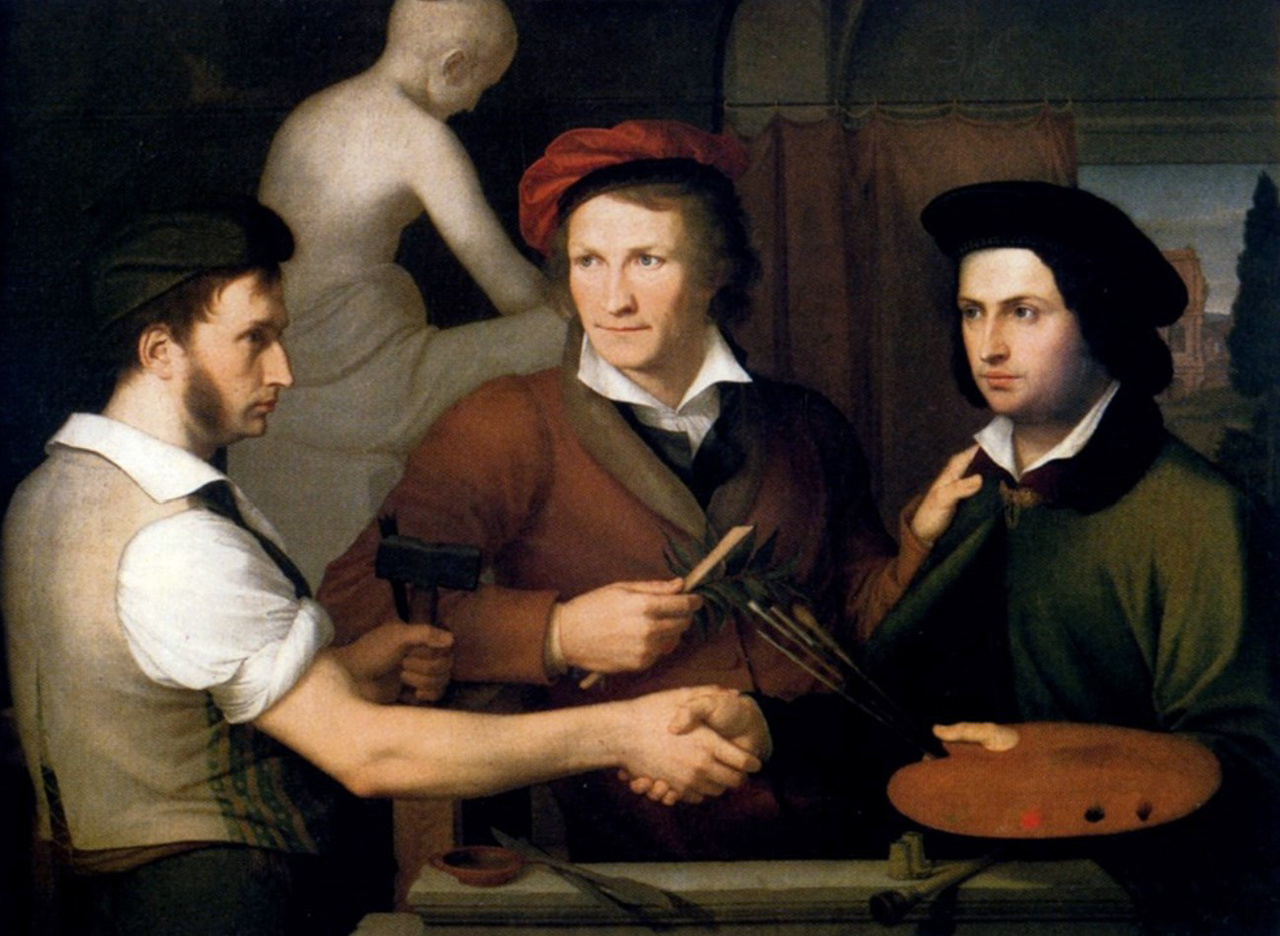
Friedrich Wilhelm Schadow, Self-Portrait with Rudolph Schadow and Bertel Thorvaldsen, c. 1815–1818; Alte Nationalgalerie, Berlin

In a 1988 monograph on Kiprensky's work, art historian Vladislav Zimenko wrote that Newspaper Readers in Naples belongs to the period when Kiprensky became interested in group portraits and their treatment as "an extension of genre painting. Zimenko noted that Kiprensky "very skillfully, tactfully 'opened' in the right part of the canvas the view of the sea with smoking Vesuvius in the distance" (which at that time was a symbol of public demonstrations and revolutionary struggle), while the artist "huddled the readers themselves in a small, cramped space". Zimenko wrote that in this work the artist managed to imbue the everyday scene with historical content, mainly due to "its complex and surprisingly natural interpretation" and "deep psychological characterization of the portrayed". According to Zimenko, this "expressive and light, in some places truly virtuoso, brilliantly written picture" aroused great interest among viewers who visited the academic exhibition in 1833.

In an article on Kiprensky's late work published in 1993, art historian Eugenia Petrova noted that the group portrait Newspaper Readers in Naples was painted by the artist "with remarkable care and, one cannot doubt, similarity". According to Petrova, the plot in this work "is not yet clearly marked, but it exists"; at the same time, "on the one hand, the subjects of the portrait are united by intense attention, concentration," and on the other — they seem separated, "each seems to have gone into himself, turned by memory, imagination to the events" described in the newspaper article. According to Petrova, in Russian art before Kiprensky such a motif was not encountered, and among Western European paintings can be analogized to the composition of the German painter Friedrich Wilhelm von Schadov Self-Portrait and Portraits of Rudolph Schadov and Bertel Thorvaldsen made between 1815 and 1818 years, noting that compared to it, the work of Kiprensky looks "much deeper, more complex and significant". Petrova wrote that the painting Newspaper Readers in Naples is more than just a group portrait, because it "has a theme that is solved in a rather multifaceted and complex way".

The art historian Magdalina Rakova described Newspaper Readers in Naples as one of the most interesting of Kiprensky's late works, writing that the painting "is one of the earliest Russian group portraits, showing not members of a family, but like-minded people, united by common interests. Among other works of this kind that appeared in the 1830s, Rakova mentioned Kapin's Workshop of P. V. Basin by Kapiton Zelentsov (1833, GRM), Seven o'clock in the Evening by Evgraf Krendovsky (1833–1835, GRM), Interior in the Apartment of A. M. Filamovitsky by Nikolai Podklyuchnikov (1835, Museum of V. A. Tropinin), In Kachanovka, the Estate of G. S. Tarnovsky by Vasily Sternberg (1838, GRM) and others. At the same time, Rakova noted that there are significant differences between these paintings and Kiprensky's. According to her, in Newspaper Readers the artist is not primarily interested in the interior and domestic component, and the psychological relationship of the characters: "the dynamic balance between the concentrated attention of the listeners and the inner excitement that each of them experiences, mentally rushing beyond this moment — that is, in fact, the psychological collision of the idea".

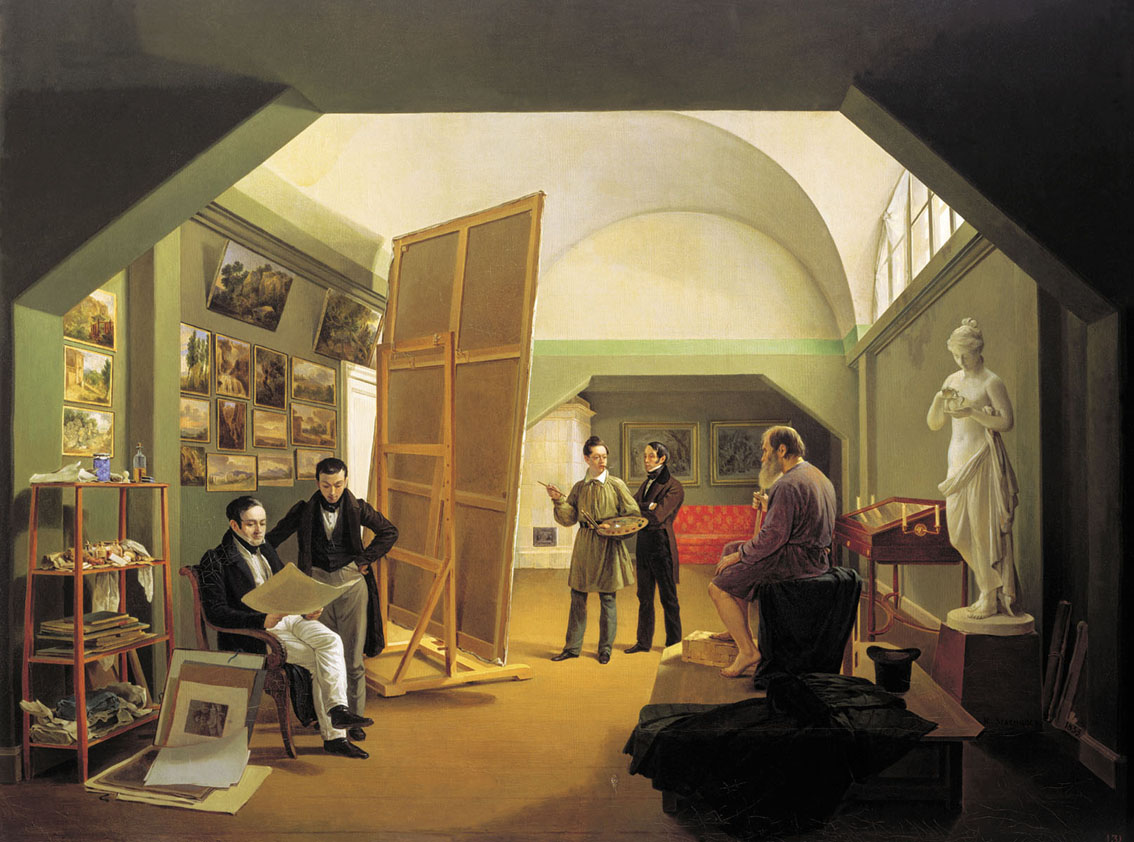
Kapiton Zelentsov, Workshop of Pyotr Basin, 1833; Russian Museum, Saint Petersburg

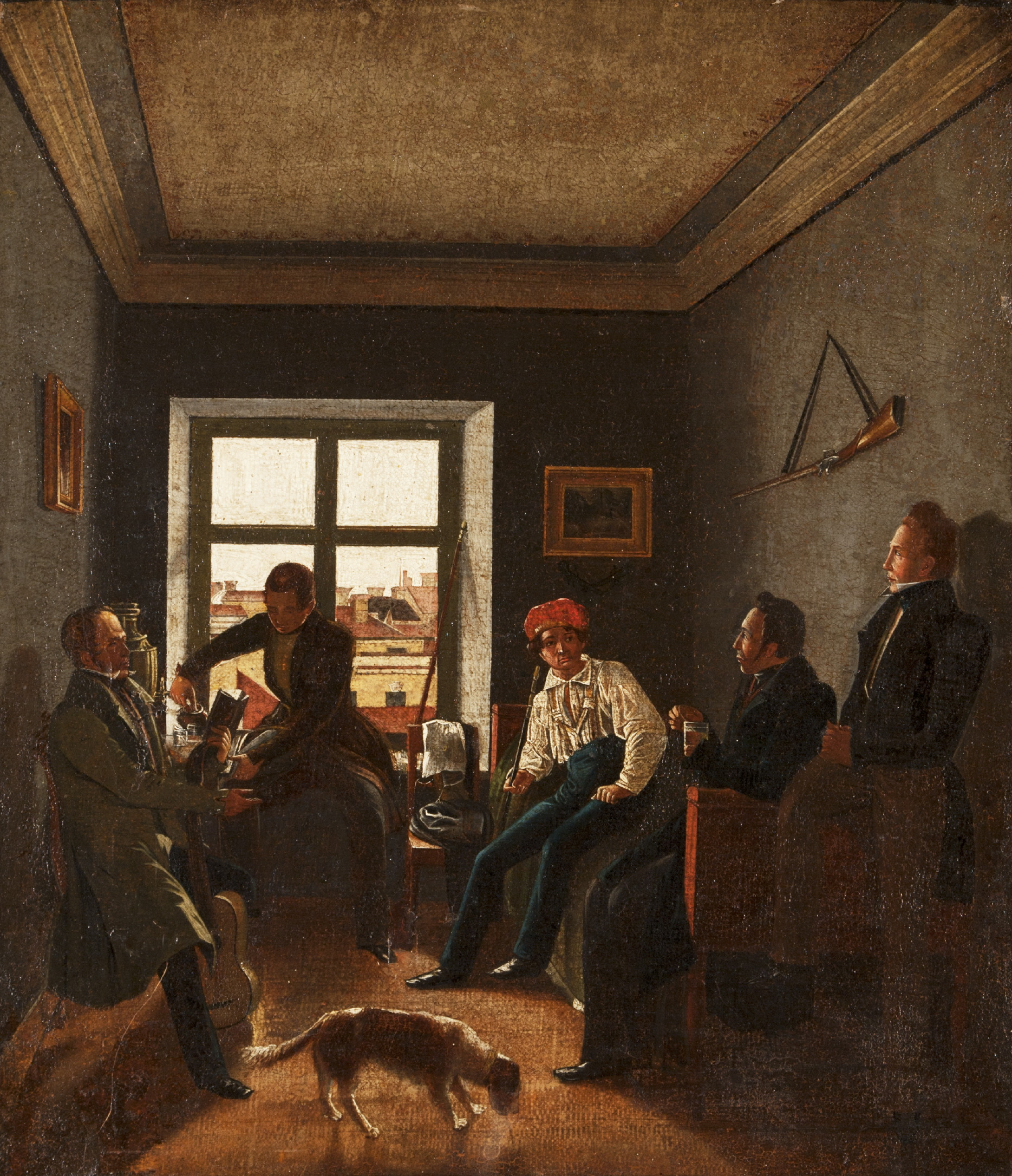
Evgraf Krendovsky, Seven O'clock in the Evening, c. 1833–1835; Russian Museum, Saint Petersburg

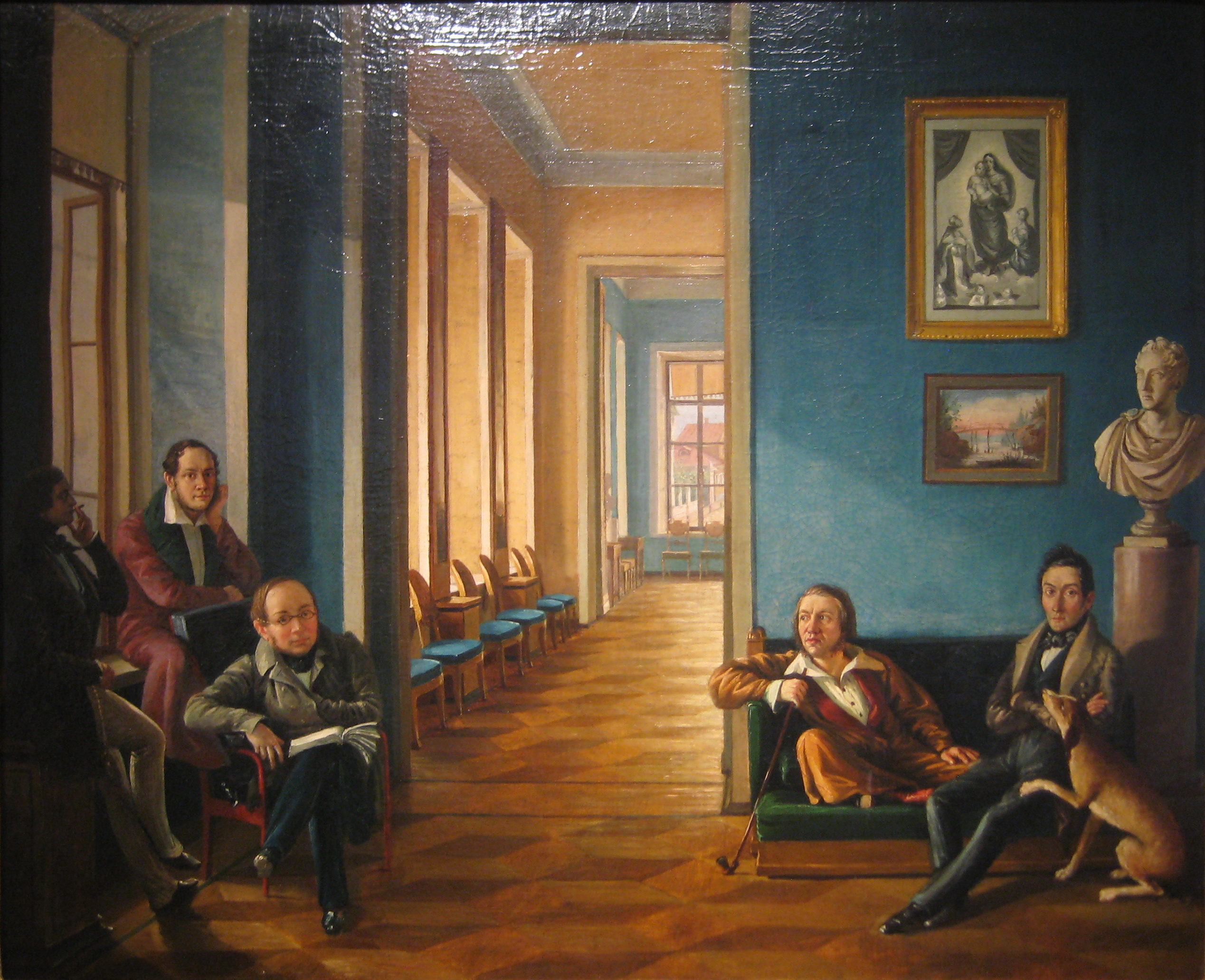
Nikolai Podklyuchnikov, Interior in the Apartment of A. M. Filamovitsky, 1835; Tropinin Museum, Moscow

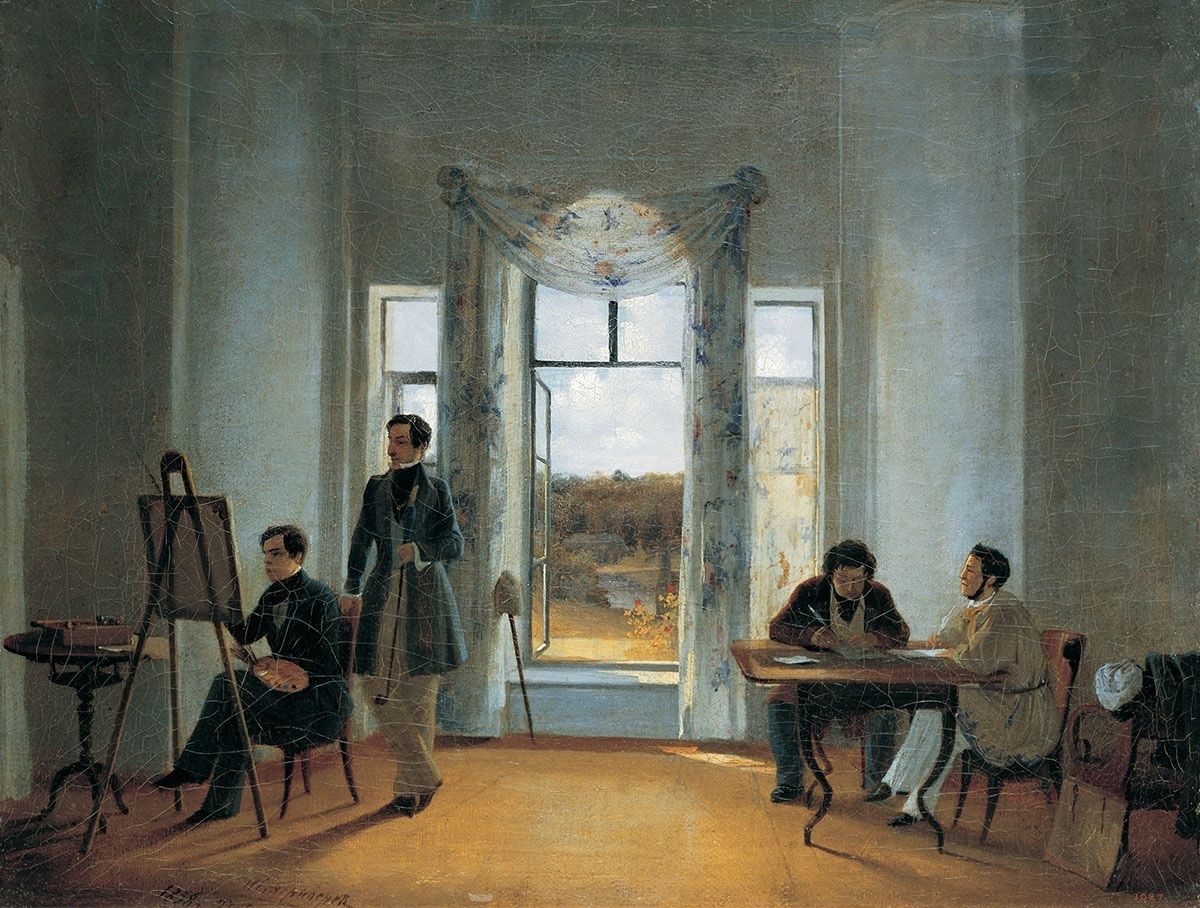
Vasily Sternberg, In Kachanovka, the estate of G. S. Tarnovsky, 1838; Tropinin Museum, Moscow

== Bibliography ==
- Чайковская, В. И. (2016). "Личный миф Ореста Кипренского". Человек (in Russian) (5): 157–164.
- Алексеева, Т. В. (1963). О. А. Кипренский. История русского искусства / И. Э. Грабарь, В. С. Кеменов, В. Н. Лазарев (in Russian). Vol. 8 (Наука ed.). М. pp. 396–470.
- Ацаркина, Э. Н. (1948). Орест Кипренский (in Russian) (Государственная Третьяковская галерея ed.). p. 246.
- Бочаров И. Н., Глушакова Ю. П. (2001). Кипренский. Жизнь замечательных людей (in Russian) (Молодая гвардия ed.). p. 390. ISBN 9-785-23502-408-3.
- Воронович, Е. В. (2017). Италия в живописи советских художников (1920—1930-е годы) (PDF). Третьяковские чтения 2016 (in Russian) (Государственная Третьяковская галерея, 2017 ed.). pp. 298–309. ISBN 978-5-89580-156-7.
- Зименко, В. М. (1988). Орест Адамович Кипренский (in Russian). Искусство. p. 352.
- Кара-Мурза, А. А. (2019). Знаменитые русские о Неаполе (in Russian). Litres. p. 352. ISBN 9785041527389.
- Кислякова, И. В. (1982). Орест Кипренский. Эпоха и герои (in Russian). Изобразительное искусство. p. 205.
- Краско, А. В. (2010). Три века городской усадьбы графов Шереметевых. Люди и события (in Russian). Litres. ISBN 9785457041431.
- Литворня, А. (2006). Дом Хлюстиных // Новая Польша (PDF) (in Russian). pp. 64–68.
- Майкапар, А. Е. (2010). Орест Адамович Кипренский (Великие художники, том 65) (PDF) (in Russian). Директ-Медиа и Комсомольская правда, 2010. p. 48. ISBN 978-5-7475-0069-3.
- Машковцев, Н. Г. (1954). Орест Адамович Кипренский. Русское искусство: очерки о жизни и творчестве художников. Первая половина XIX века / А. И. Леонов (in Russian). Искусство. pp. 189–220.
- Михайлова, К. В. (1986). Орест Адамович Кипренский. Массовая библиотека по искусству (in Russian). Л.: Художник РСФСР. p. 96.
- Новицкий, А. П. (1889). Художественная галерея Московского публичного и Румянцевского музея. Критическо-исторический очерк (in Russian). М.: Типография А. И. Мамонтова. p. 315.
- Перкин, Е. Н. (2000). Современники А. С. Пушкина на портретах О. А. Кипренского. Массовая библиотека по искусству (in Russian). М.: Новый Ключ, 2000. p. 111. ISBN 978-5708201010.
- Петинова, Е. Ф. (2001). Русские художники XVIII — начала XX века (in Russian). М.: Аврора. p. 345. ISBN 978-5-7300-0714-7.
- Петрова, Е. Н. (1993). О некоторых проблемах позднего творчества Кипренского // В книге «Орест Кипренский. Новые материалы и исследования» (in Russian). СПб.: Искусство-СПб. pp. 93–107.
- Петрова, Е. Н. (2000). Орест Кипренский. Золотая галерея русской живописи (in Russian). М.: Арт-Родник. p. 72.
- Ракова, М. М. (1996). О. А. Кипренский — портретист // Очерки по истории русского портрета первой половины XIX века / И. М. Шмидт. Золотая галерея русской живописи (in Russian). М.: Искусство. pp. 7–45.
- Романов, Н. И. (1905). Московская Румянцевская галерея. Золотая галерея русской живописи (in Russian). М.: Издание И. Н. Кнебеля. p. 104.
- Сарабьянов, Д. В. (1982). Кипренский. Русские живописцы XIX века (in Russian). Л.: Художник РСФСР. p. 208.
- Турчин, В. С. (1975). Орест Кипренский (in Russian). М.: Изобразительное искусство. p. 168.
- Чайковская, В. И. (2020). Чайковская В. И. Адам Мицкевич в зеркалах Кипренского и Пушкина. Альманах «Чайка» (in Russian). pp. 186–198.
- Адам Мицкевич в русской печати. 1825—1955. М.—Л.: Издательство Академии наук СССР, 1957. 599 p.
- Государственная Третьяковская галерея — каталог собрания / Я. В. Брук, Л. И. Иовлева. М.: СканРус, 2005. V. 3: Живопись первой половины XIX века. 484 p. ISBN 5-93221-081-8.
- Государственный Русский музей — каталог собрания / Г. Н. Голдовский. СПб.: Palace Editions, 2007. V. 3: Живопись первой половины XIX века (К—Я). 272 p. ISBN 978-5-93332-263-4.
- Московский публичный и Румянцевский музеи. Каталог картинной галереи. М.: Типография К. Л. Меньшова, 1908. 140 p.
- Орест Кипренский. Переписка. Документы. Свидетельства современников / Е. Н. Петрова, Я. В. Брук. СПб.: Искусство-СПб, 1994. 760 p.
- Письма художников Павлу Михайловичу Третьякову: 1856—1869 / Н. Г. Галкина, М. Н. Григорьева. М.: Искусство, 1960. 372 p.
- Указатель художественной выставки редких вещей, принадлежащих частным лицам. СПб.: Типография И. Глазунова, 1851. 74 p.
