= Ekaterina Telesheva =

Russian ballerina (1804–1857)

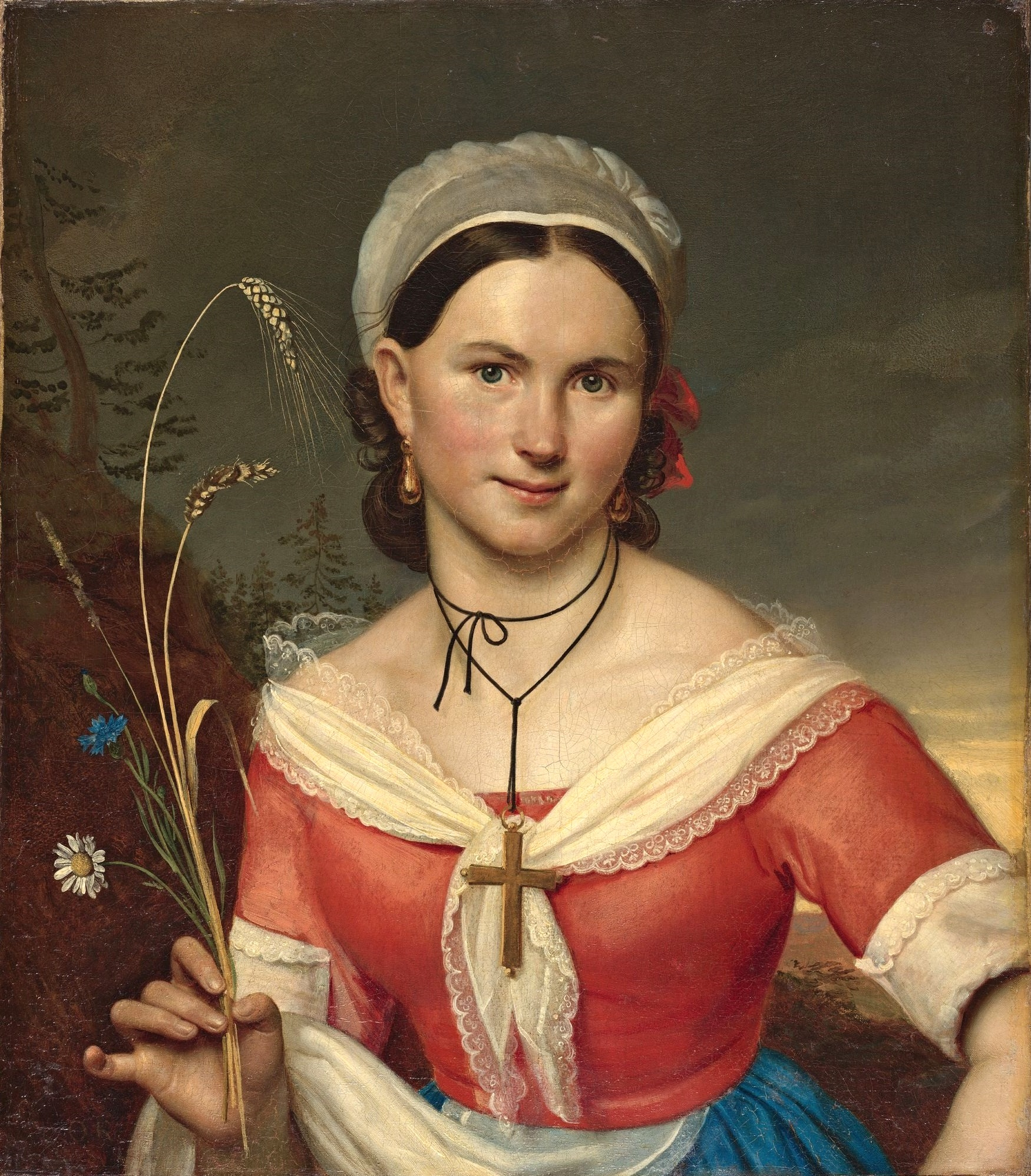
E. Telesheva by Orest Kiprensky

Ekaterina Telesheva (1804–1857) was a Russian ballerina. She was engaged at the Imperial Theatres in 1820–1842, during which she had a successful career and referred to as the elite of her profession of her generation and appointed to the rank of court dancer.
