= Evgraf Davydov =

Major-general of the Russian Empire (1775–1823)

Evgraf Vladimirovich Davydov
- Russian: Евгра́ф Влади́мирович Давы́дов
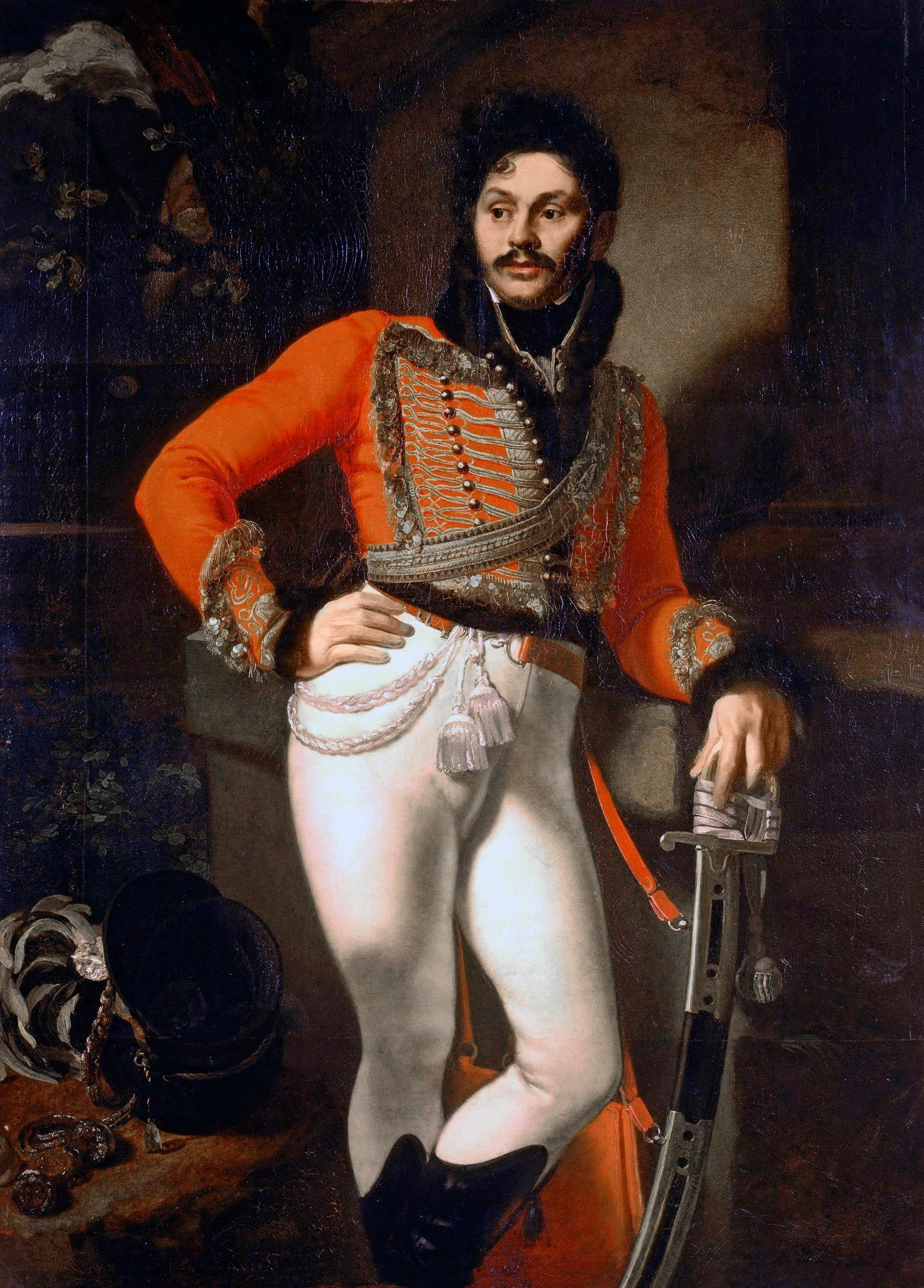
- Colonel Evgraf Davydov, by Orest Kiprensky, 1809
- Born: 1775; Tula Governorate, Russian Empire
- Died: 1823 (aged 47-48)
- Military career
- Allegiance: Russian Empire
- Branch: Imperial Russian Army
- Service years: 1791–1823
- Rank: Major general
- Conflicts: War of the Third Coalition; Battle of Austerlitz; War of the Fourth Coalition; Battle of Guttstadt-Deppen; Battle of Heilsberg; Battle of Friedland; French invasion of Russia; Battle of Ostrovno; War of the Sixth Coalition; Battle of Kulm; Battle of Leipzig
- Awards: Order of St. George; Order of St. Vladimir; Order of St. Anna; Order of the Red Eagle; Gold Sword for Bravery

Evgraf Vladimirovich Davydov (Russian: Евгра́ф Влади́мирович Давы́дов; 1775 – 20 December 1823) was a major-general of the Russian Empire, who served in the era of the Napoleonic Wars. Davydov fought in the War of the Fourth Coalition, the War of the Fifth Coalition, and the War of the Sixth Coalition, losing a limb during the Battle of Leipzig, but nonetheless remaining in military service until his death.

== Biography ==
Evgraf Davydov was born to a noble Russian family in the Tula Governorate. On 9 September 1791, at the age of 16, he became a watch-master (Russian: Ва́хмистр) in the Life Guard Horse Regiment. Several years later, in 1798, he was transferred as a cornet to the Life Guard Hussar Regiment. On 12 April 1803, Davydov was promoted to the rank of colonel (polkovnik), and in 1805 he fought at the Battle of Austerlitz. Two years later, during the War of the Fourth Coalition, Davydov fought at the battles of Guttstadt-Deppen, Heislberg, and Friedland. During Napoleon's invasion of Russia, Davydov served in the "2nd Brigade of the Guard Cavalry Division of the 1st Reserve Cavalry corps in the First Western Army" according to Prof. Alexander Mikaberidze. At the Battle of Ostrovno, Davydov's left hand was severely wounded. Once healed, Davydov fought at the battle of Kulm; for his deeds in this battle he was promoted to major-general and appointed chef of the Lubensk Hussar Regiment on 5 September 1813, with "seniority", as Mikaberidze states, dating from August 1813. In the Battle of Leipzig, Evgraf Davydov was grievously wounded, and lost his right arm and left leg. He received several decorations in the ensuing weeks, including the Order of St. George (3rd class) on 22 February 1814, as well as the Order of the Red Eagle (2nd class) by the king of Prussia, Frederick William III.

== Sources ==
- Mikaberidze, Alexander (2005). Russian Officer Corps of the Revolutionary and Napoleonic Wars. Savas Beatie. ISBN 978-1611210026.
- Polovtsov, Alexander A., ed. (1905). "Давыдов, Евграф Владимирович". Russian Biographical Dictionary (in Russian). Vol. 6. St. Petersburg: Obshchestvennaya Pol'za. p. 23.
- "ДАВЫДОВ Евграф Владимирович, генерал-майор". museum.ru (in Russian).
