= Orest Kiprensky =

Russian portrait painter (1782–1836)

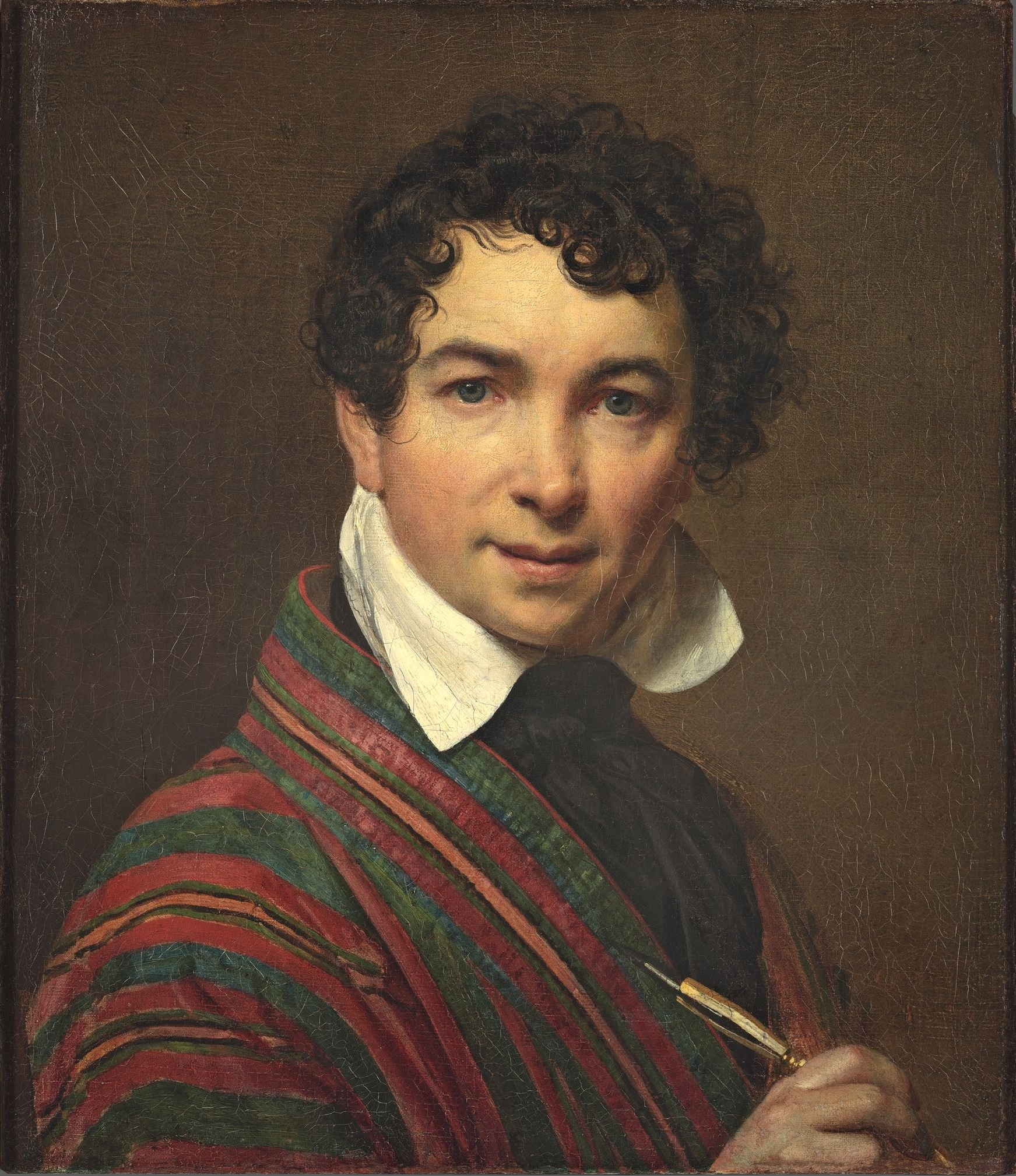
- Self-Portrait in A Striped Khalat, 1828, Tretyakov Gallery
- Born: Orest Adamovich Kiprensky; 24 March 1782; Nezhnovo, Yamburgsky Uyezd, Saint Petersburg Governorate, Russian Empire
- Died: 17 October 1836 (aged 54); Rome, Papal States (now Italy)
- Resting place: Sant'Andrea delle Fratte, Rome
- Education: Grigory Ugryumov
- Known for: Portrait painting
- Notable work: Alexander Pushkin, 1827; Newspaper Readers in Naples, 1831
- Movement: Romanticism
- Spouse: Anna Maria Falcucci (m. 1836)
- Awards: Big Gold Medal of the Imperial Academy of Arts
- Elected: Member Academy of Arts (1812)

External image
- Carl Christian Vogel von Vogelstein, Orest Kiprensky, 1823, brown chalk on paper; Kupferstich-Kabinett, Dresden

Orest Adamovich Kiprensky (Russian: Оре́ст Ада́мович Кипре́нский; 24 March [O.S. 13 March] 1782 – 17 October [O.S. 5 October] 1836) was a leading Russian portraitist in the Age of Romanticism. His most familiar work is probably his portrait of Alexander Pushkin (1827), which prompted the poet to remark that "the mirror flatters me."

== Biography ==
Orest was born in the village of Nezhnovo in the Saint Petersburg Governorate on 24 March [O.S. 13 March] 1782. He was an illegitimate son of a landowner Alexey Dyakonov, hence his name, derived from Kypris, one of the Greek names for the goddess of love. He was raised in the family of Adam Shvalbe, a serf. Although Kiprensky was born a serf, he was released from the serfdom upon his birth and later his father helped him to enter a boarding school at the Imperial Academy of Arts in Saint Petersburg in 1788 (when Orest was only six years old).

He studied at the boarding school and the Imperial Academy itself until 1803. He lived at the academy for three more years as a pensioner to fulfill requirements necessary to win the Major Gold medal. Winning the first prize for his work Prince Dmitri Donskoi after the Battle of Kulikovo (1805) enabled the young artist to go abroad to study art in Europe.

A year before his graduation, in 1804, he painted the portrait of Adam Shvalbe, his foster father (1804), which was a great success. The portrait so impressed his contemporaries, that later members of the Naples Academy of Arts took it for the painting by some Old Master – Rubens or van Dyck. Kiprensky had to ask the members of the Imperial Academy of Arts for letters supporting his authorship.

After that, Kiprensky lived in Moscow (1809), Tver 1811, Saint Petersburg 1812, in 1816–1822 he lived in Rome and Naples. In Italy he met a local girl Anna Maria Falcucci (Mariucci), to whom he became attached. He bought her from her dissolute family and employed as his ward. On leaving Italy, he sent her to a Roman Catholic convent.

In 1828, Kiprensky came back to Italy, as he got a letter from his friend Samuil Galberg, informing him that they had lost track of Mariucci. Kiprensky found Mariucci, who had been transferred to another convent. In 1836 he eventually married her. He had to convert into Roman Catholicism from Russian Orthodoxy for this marriage to happen. He died by pneumonia in Rome later that year. He has been interred into the church of Sant'Andrea delle Fratte.

== Selected works ==
Portrait paintings

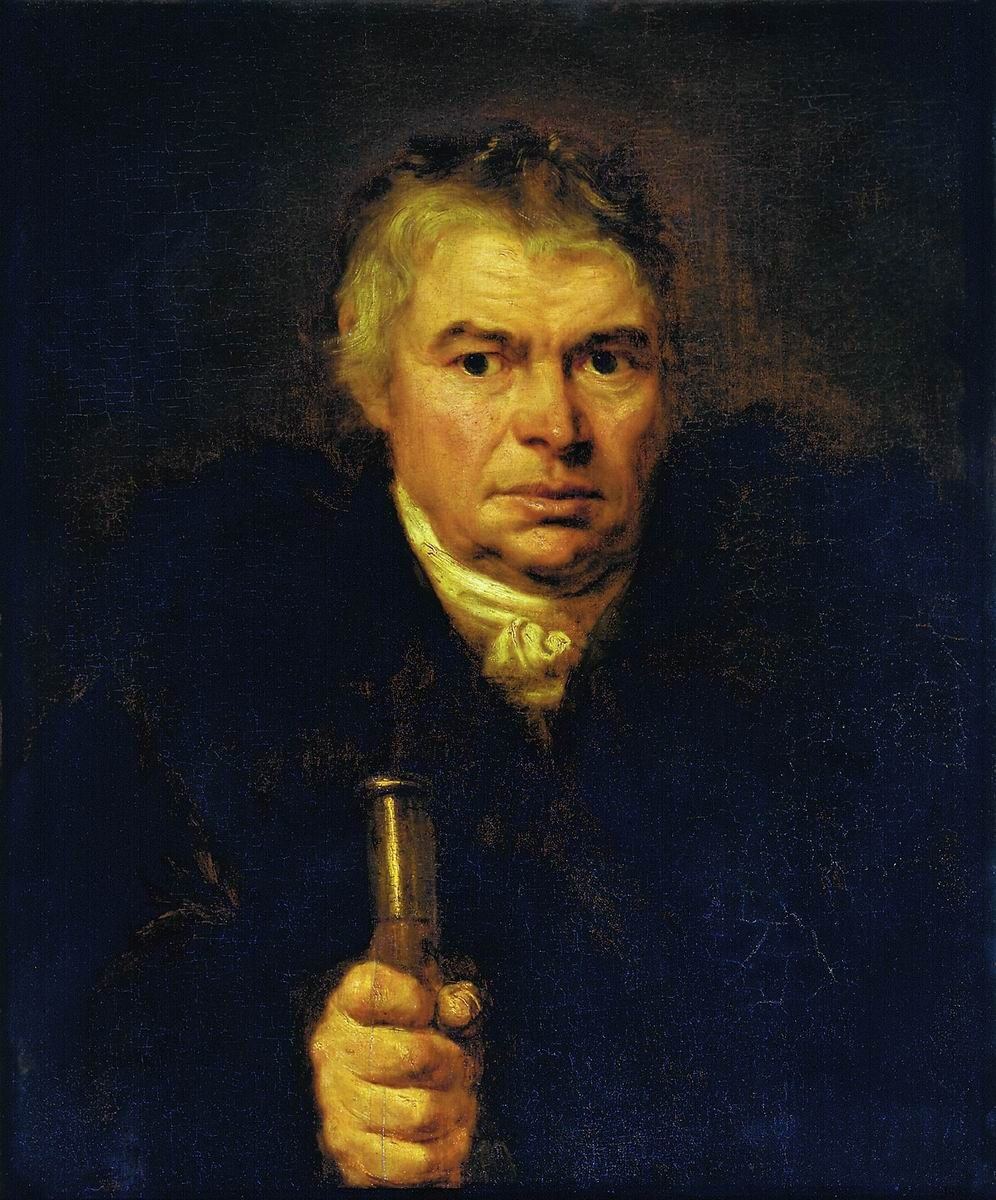
Adam Schwalbe, the painter's stepfather, 1804

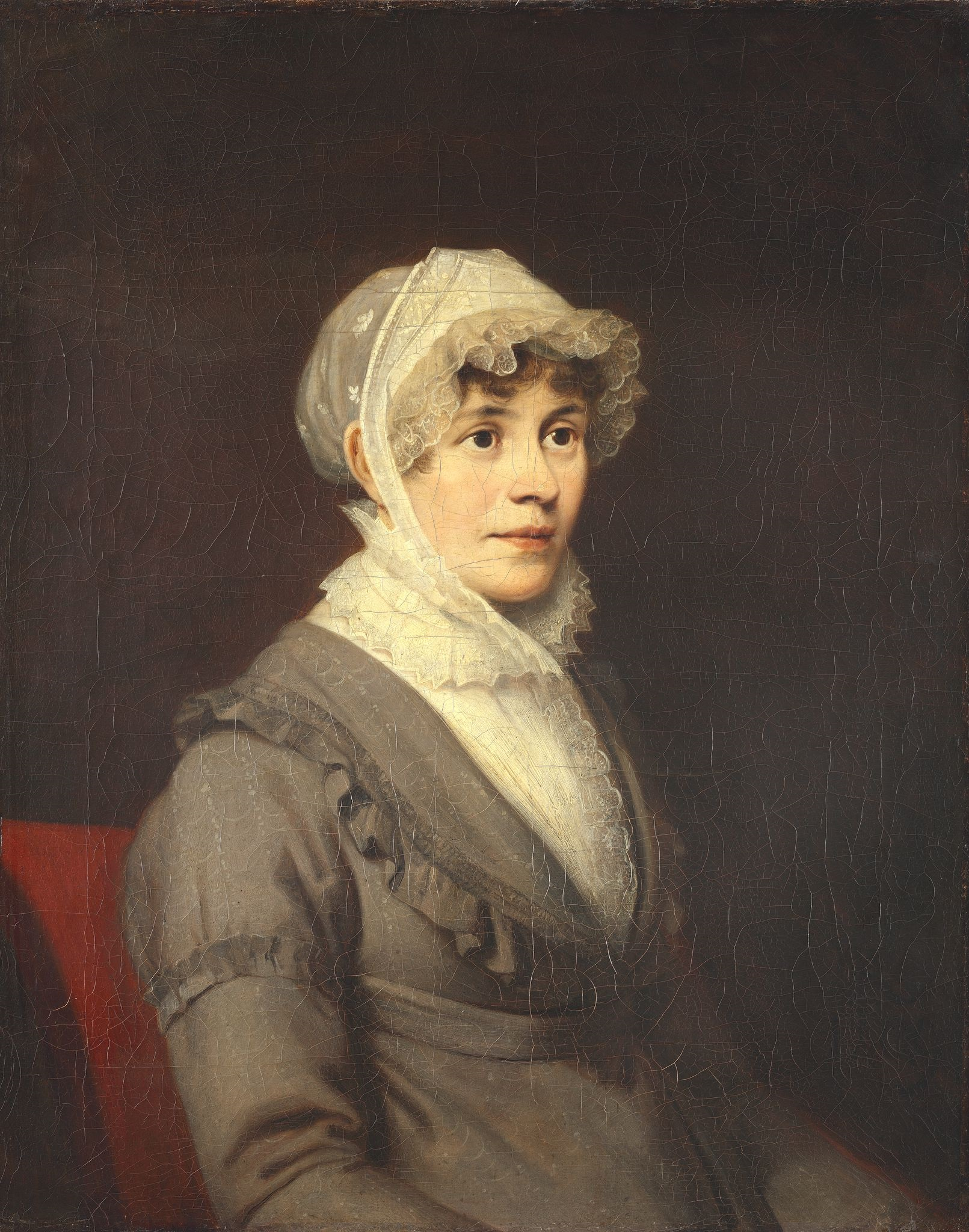
Countess Yekaterina Rostopchina, 1809

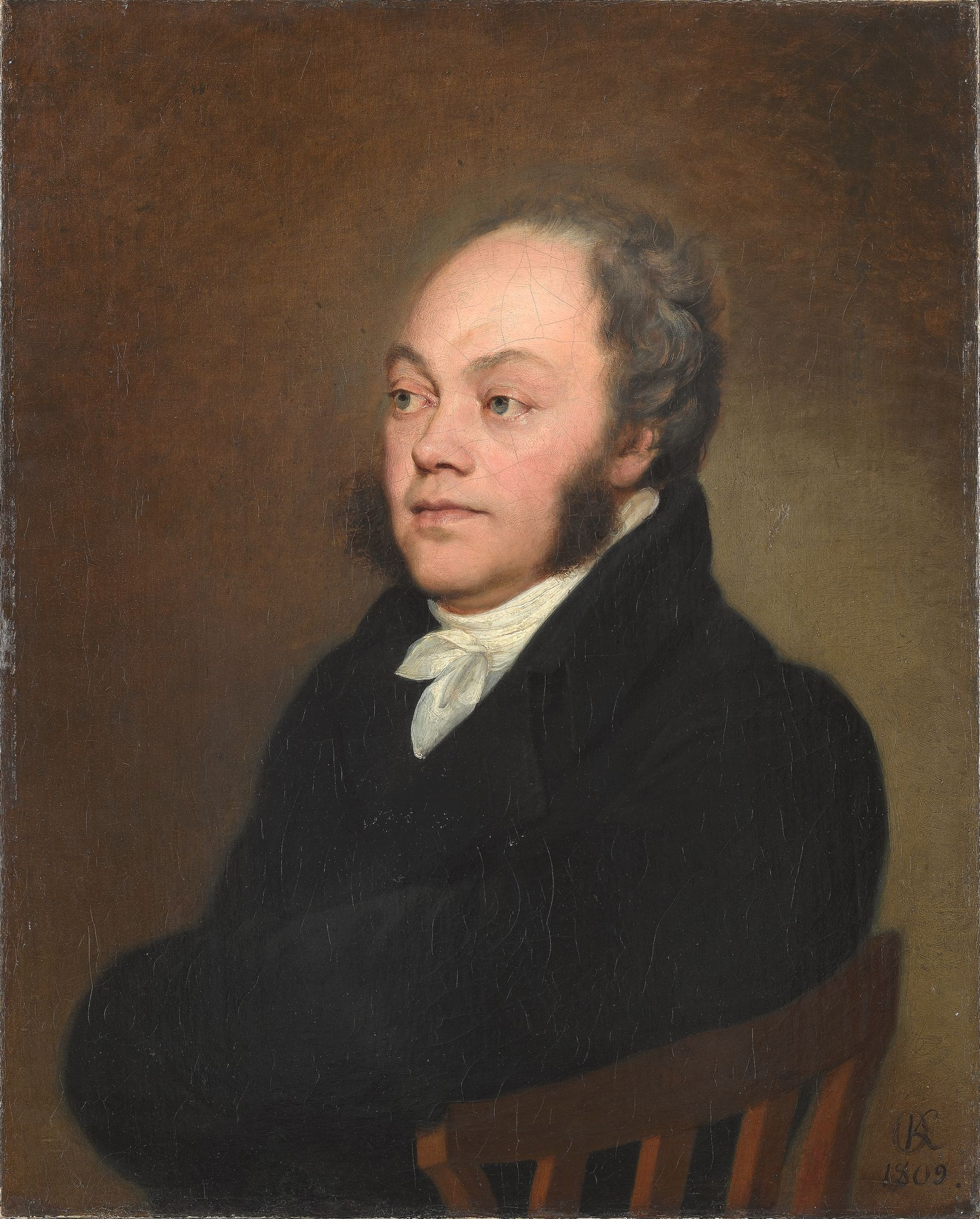
Count Fyodor Rostopchin, 1809

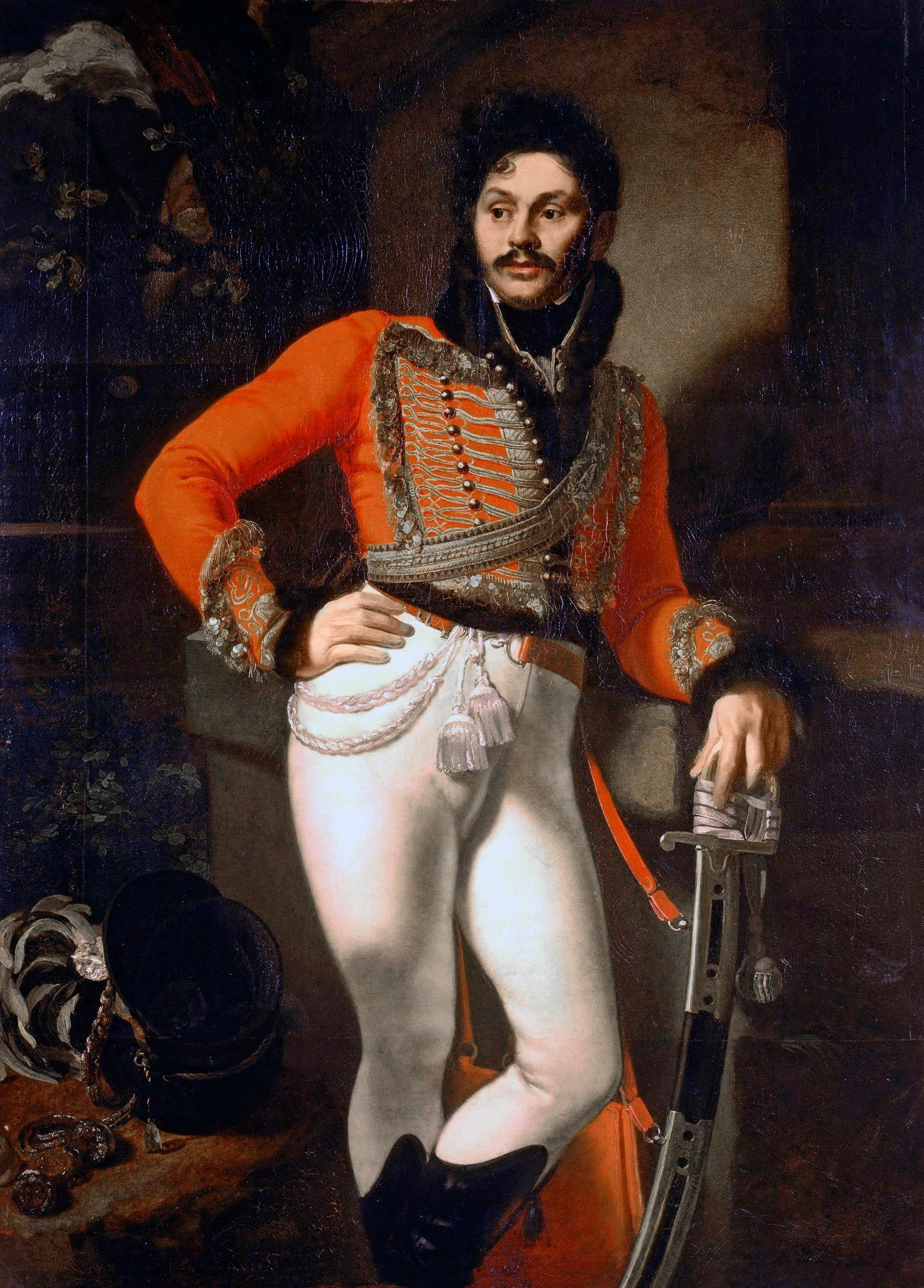
Evgraf Davydov, 1809

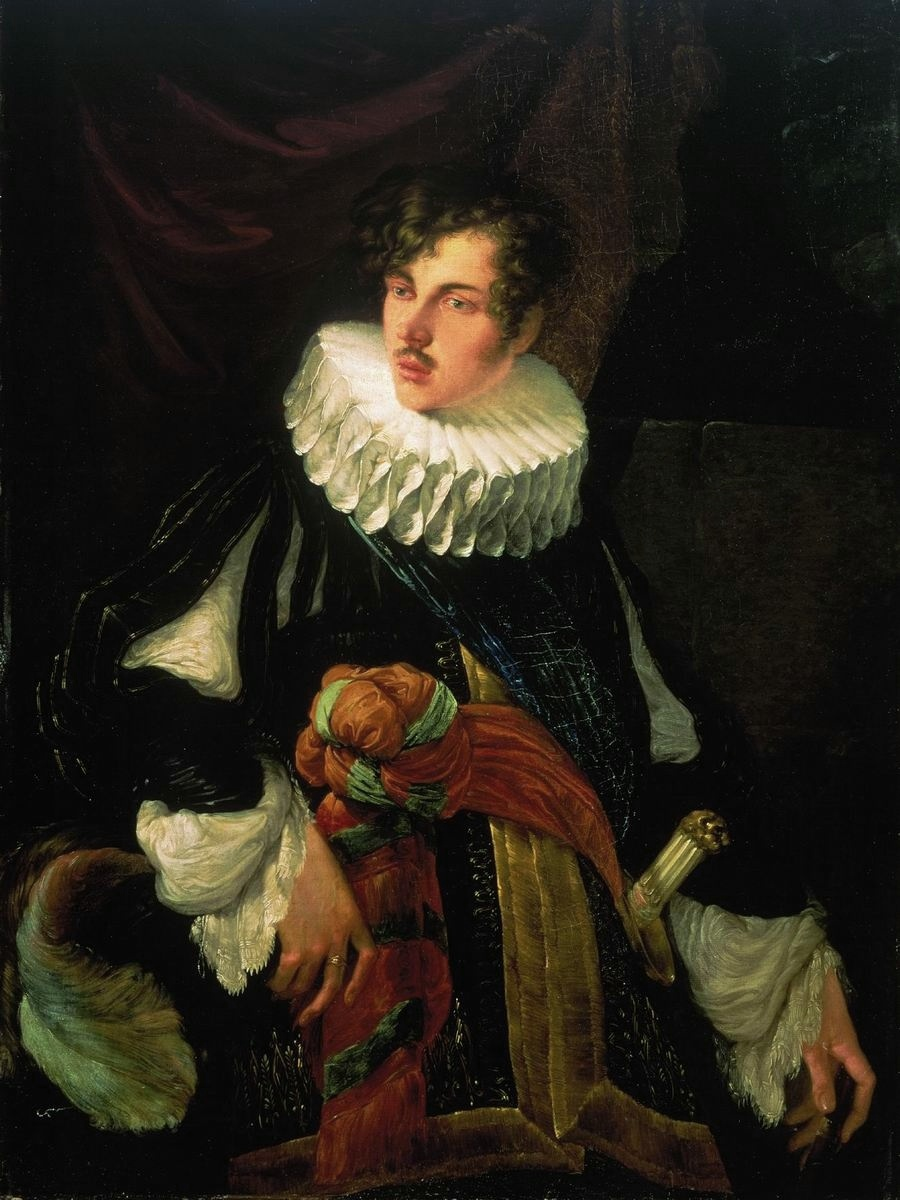
The Young Man in a Spanish Costume, the so-called Vasily Perovsky, 1811

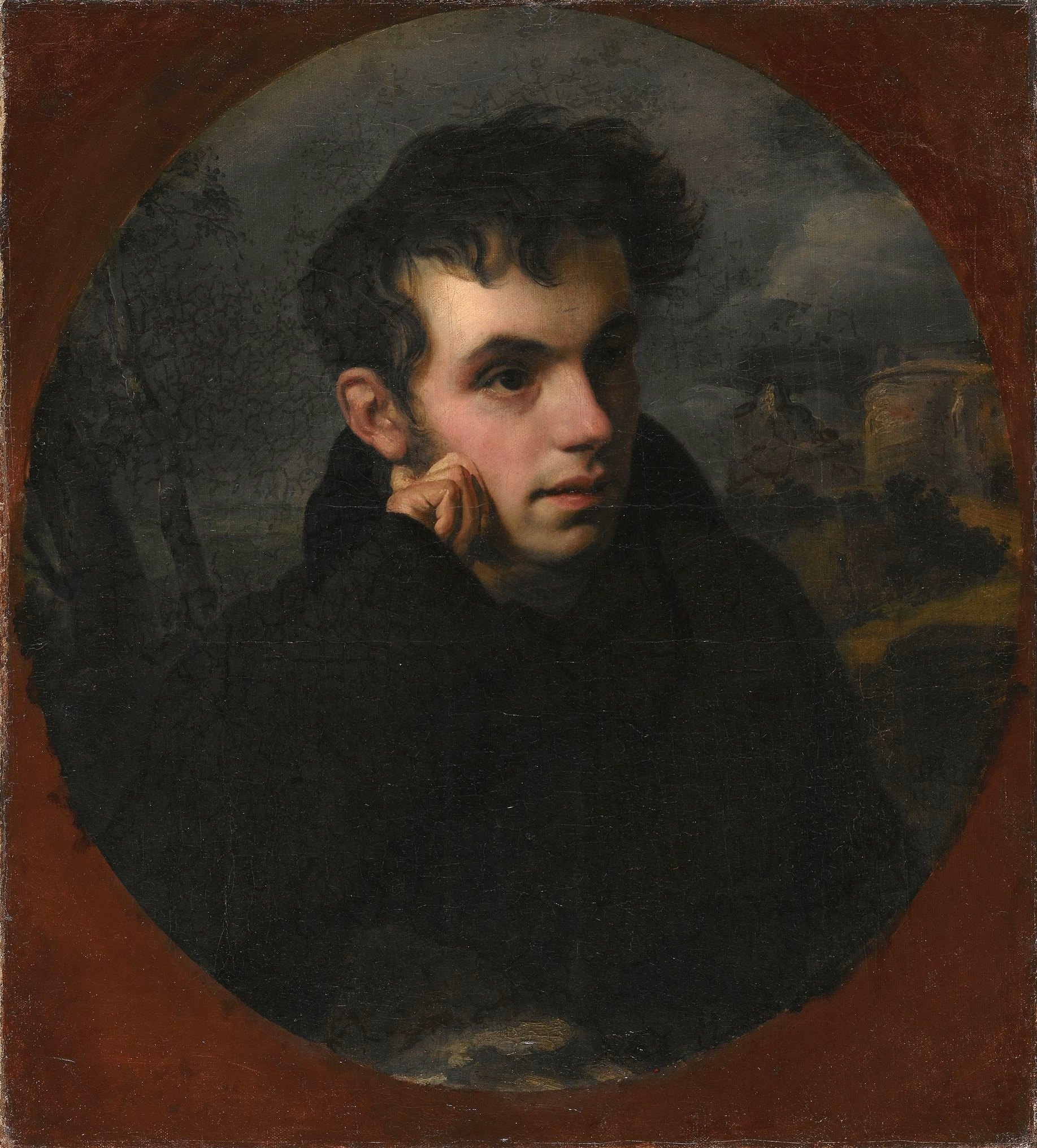
Vasily Zhukovsky, 1815

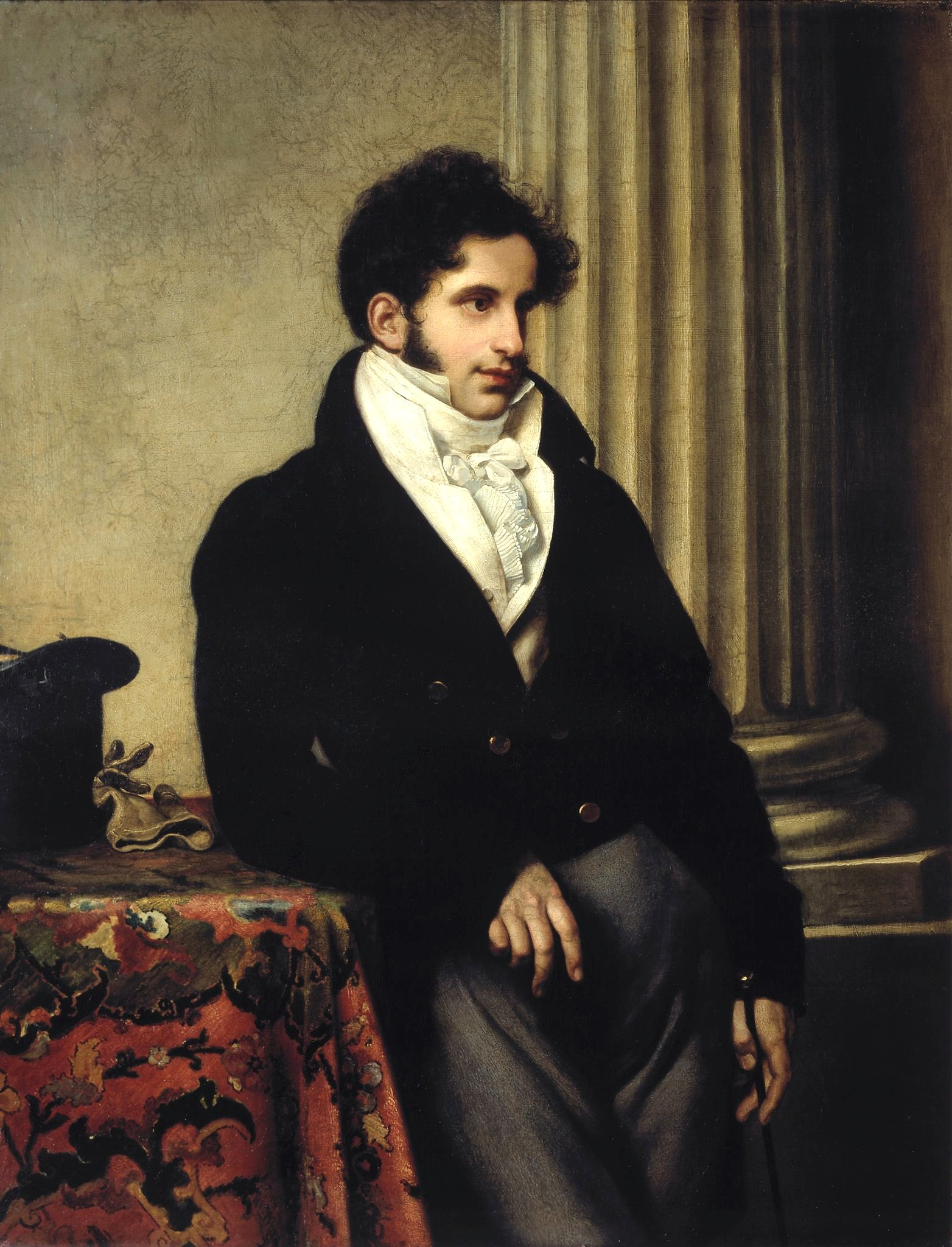
Sergey Uvarov, 1815

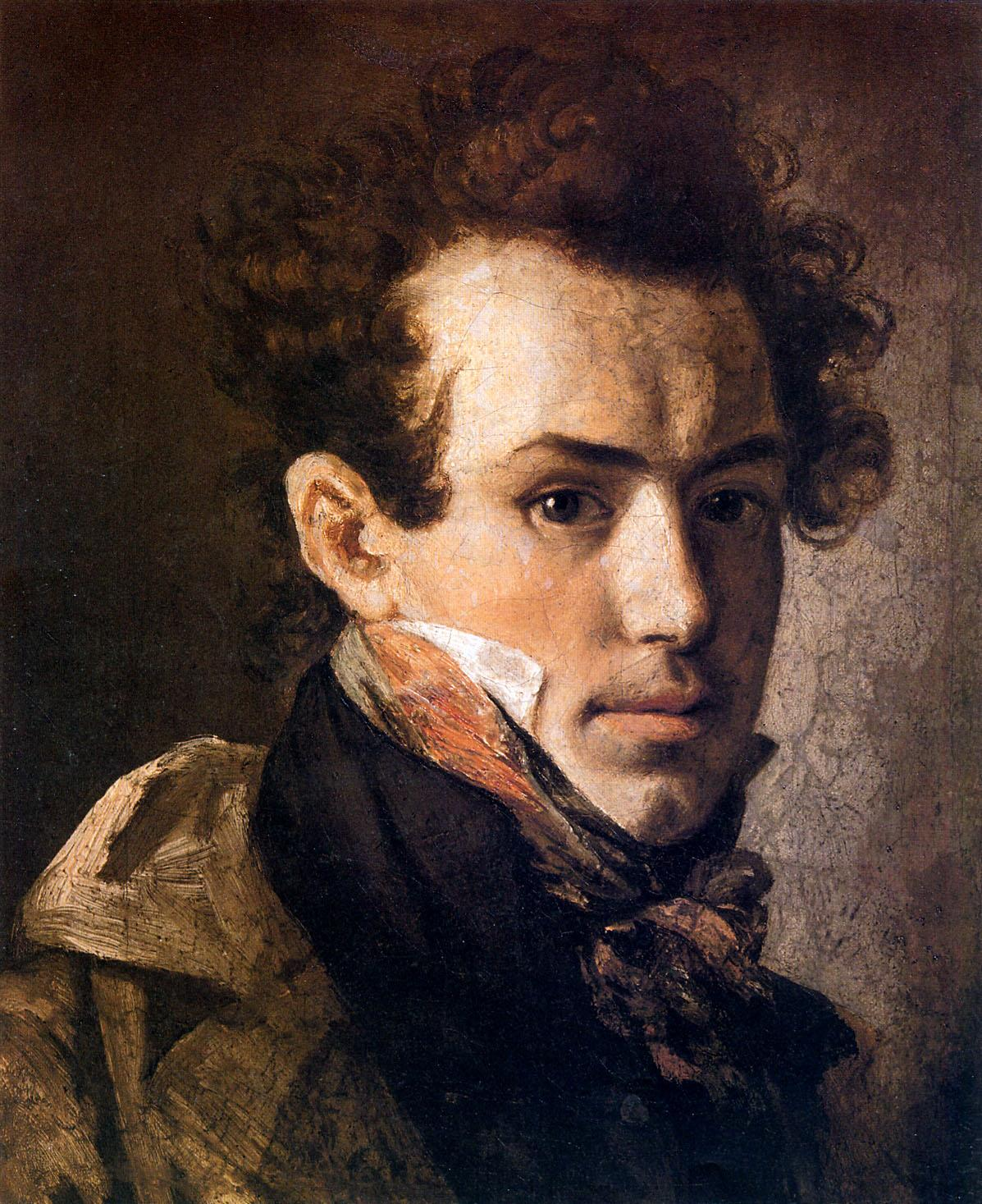
The Young Man in a Neckerchief, the so-called Karl Albrecht, с. 1816

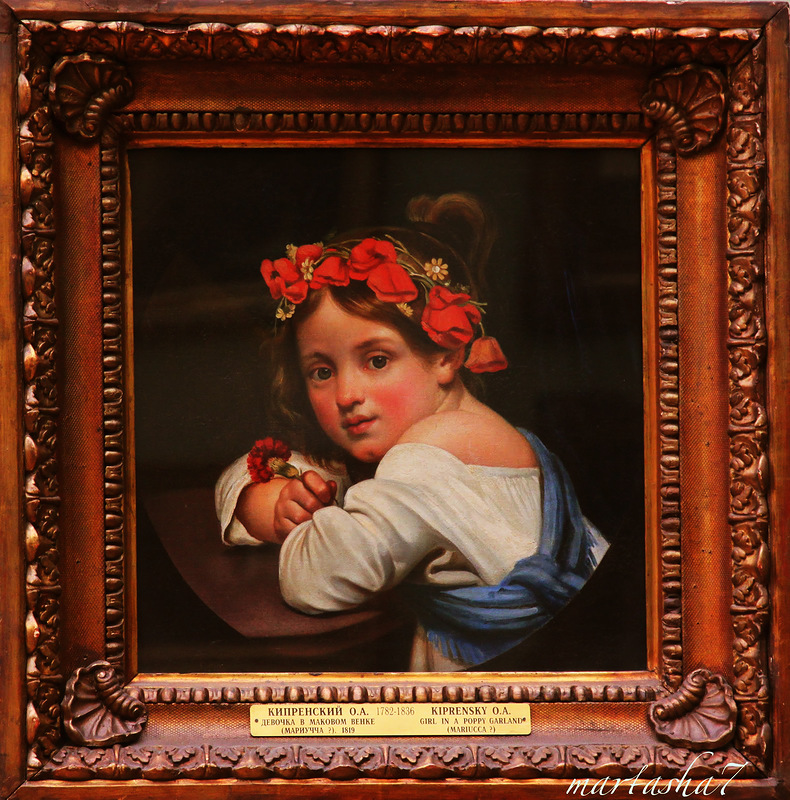
Anna Maria Falcucci as the Girl in a Poppy Wreath Holding a Carnation, 1819

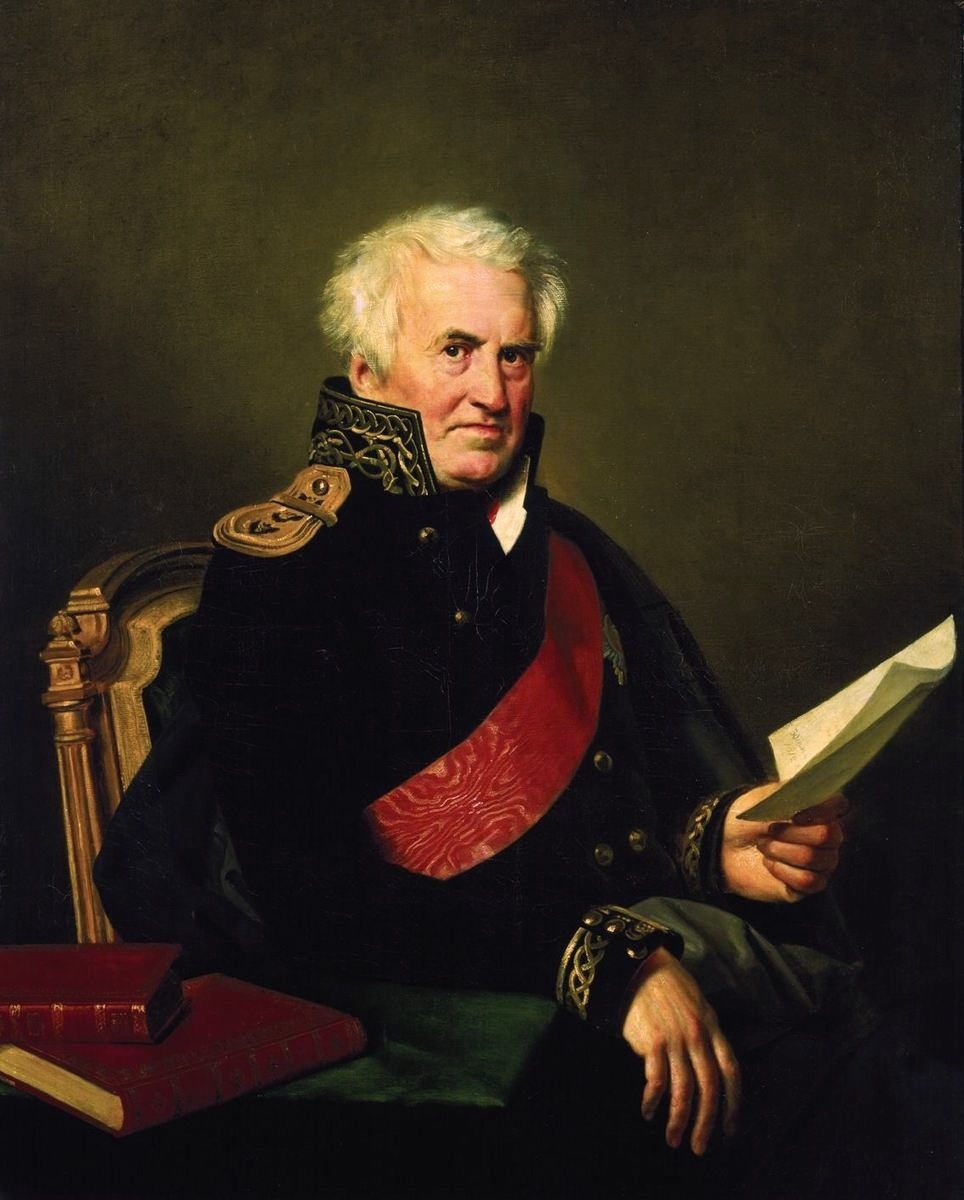
Alexander Shishkov, 1825

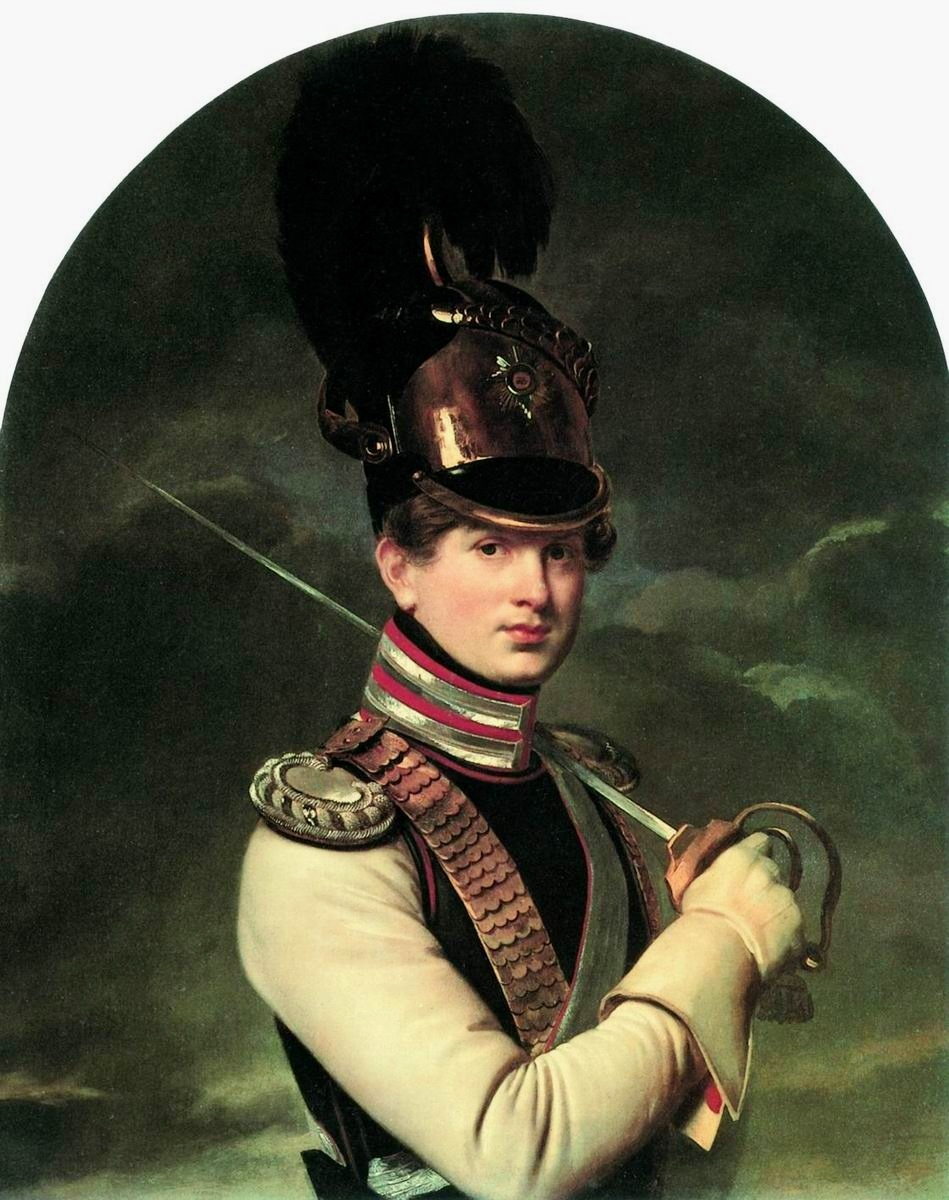
Prince Nikita Petrovich Trubetzkoy, 1826

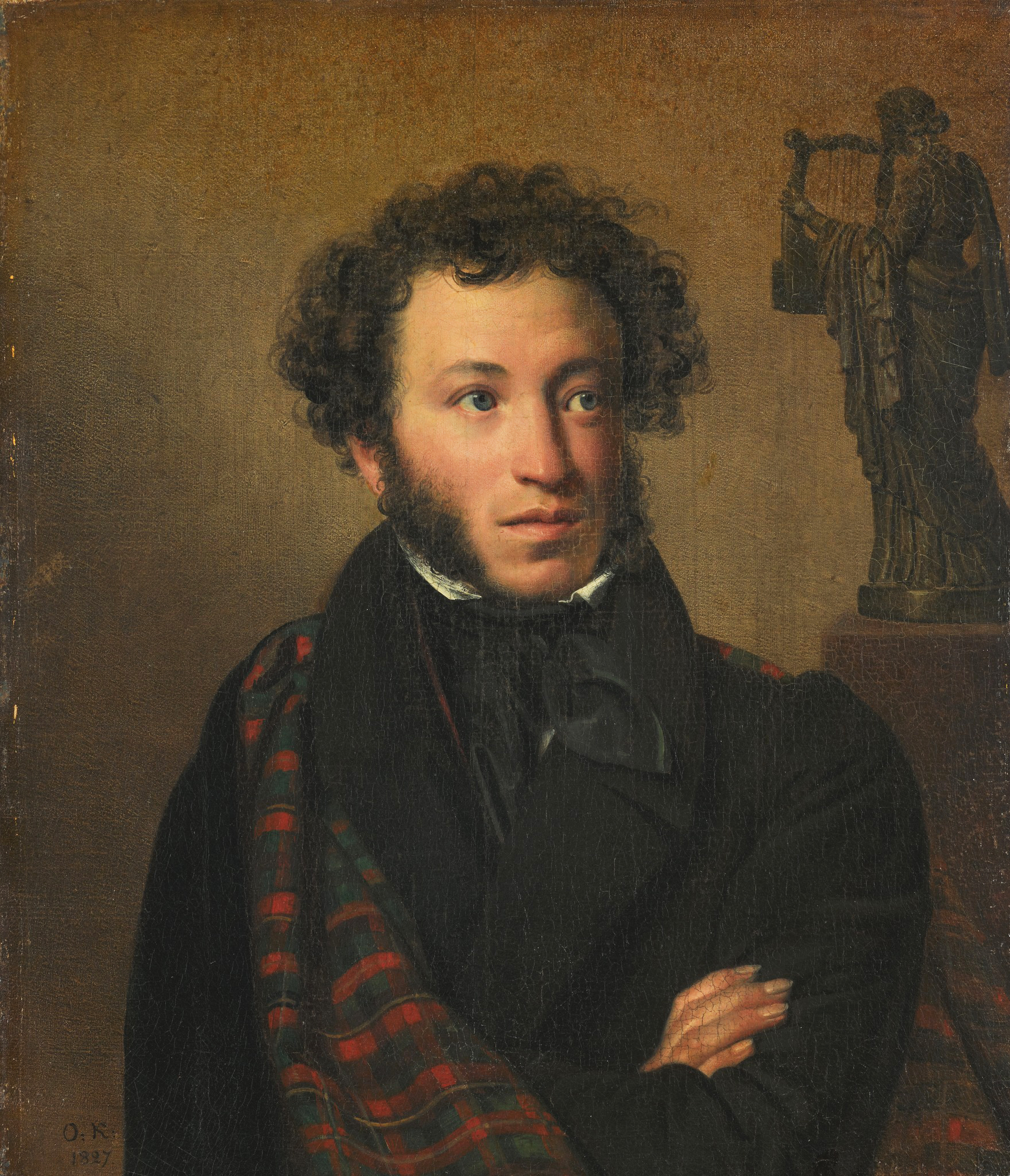
Alexander Pushkin, 1827

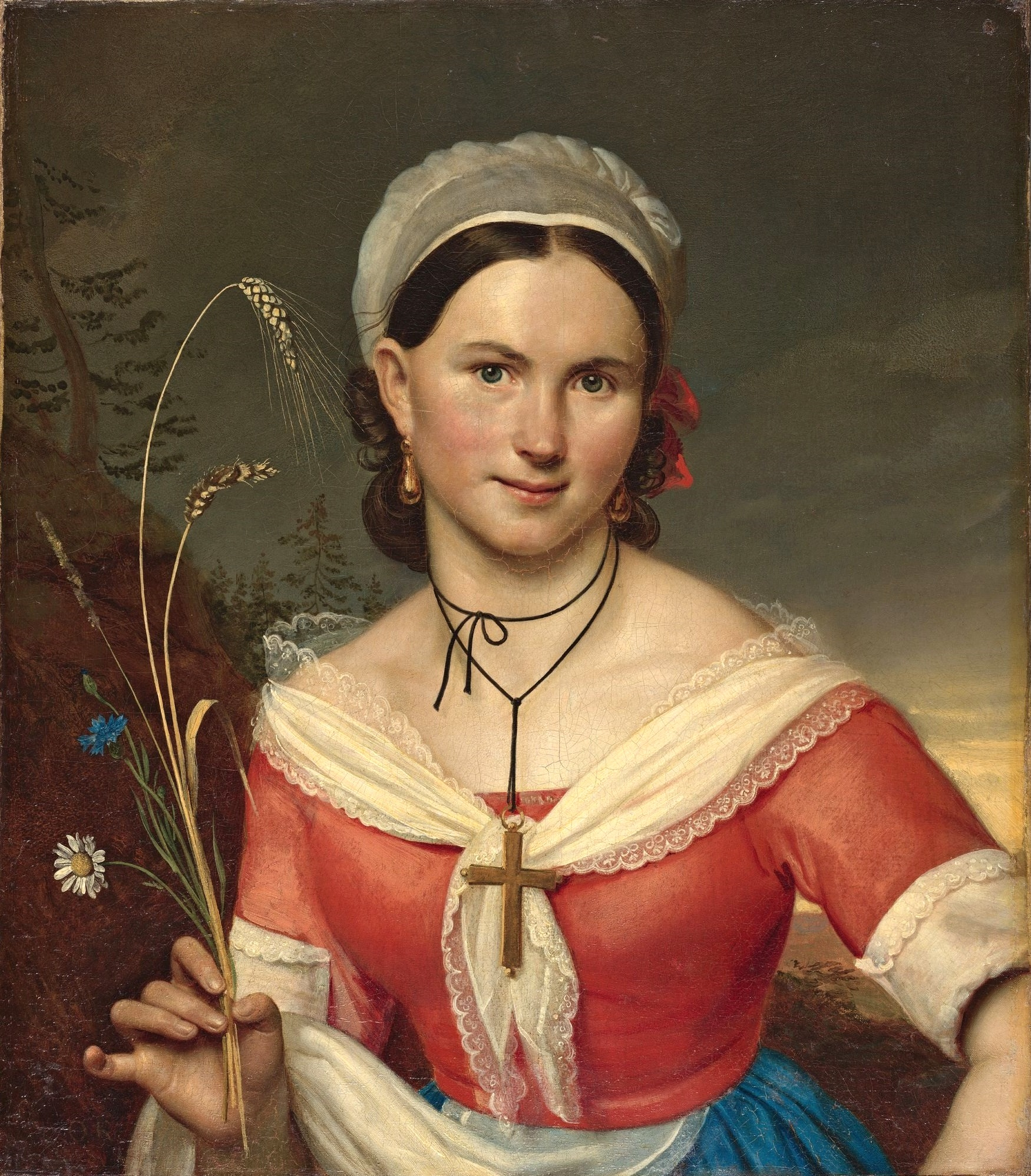
Ekaterina Telesheva, 1828

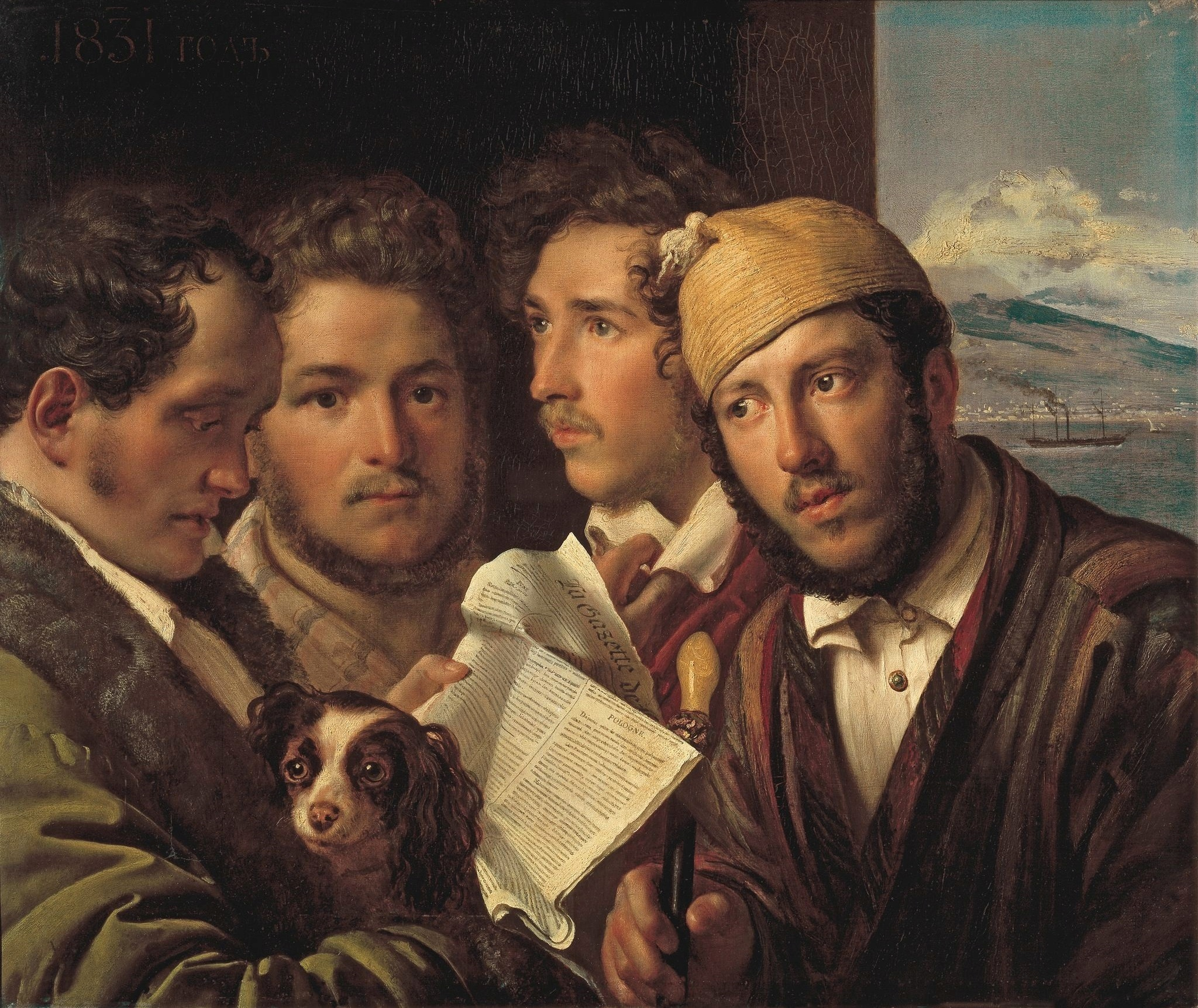
Newspaper Readers in Naples, 1831

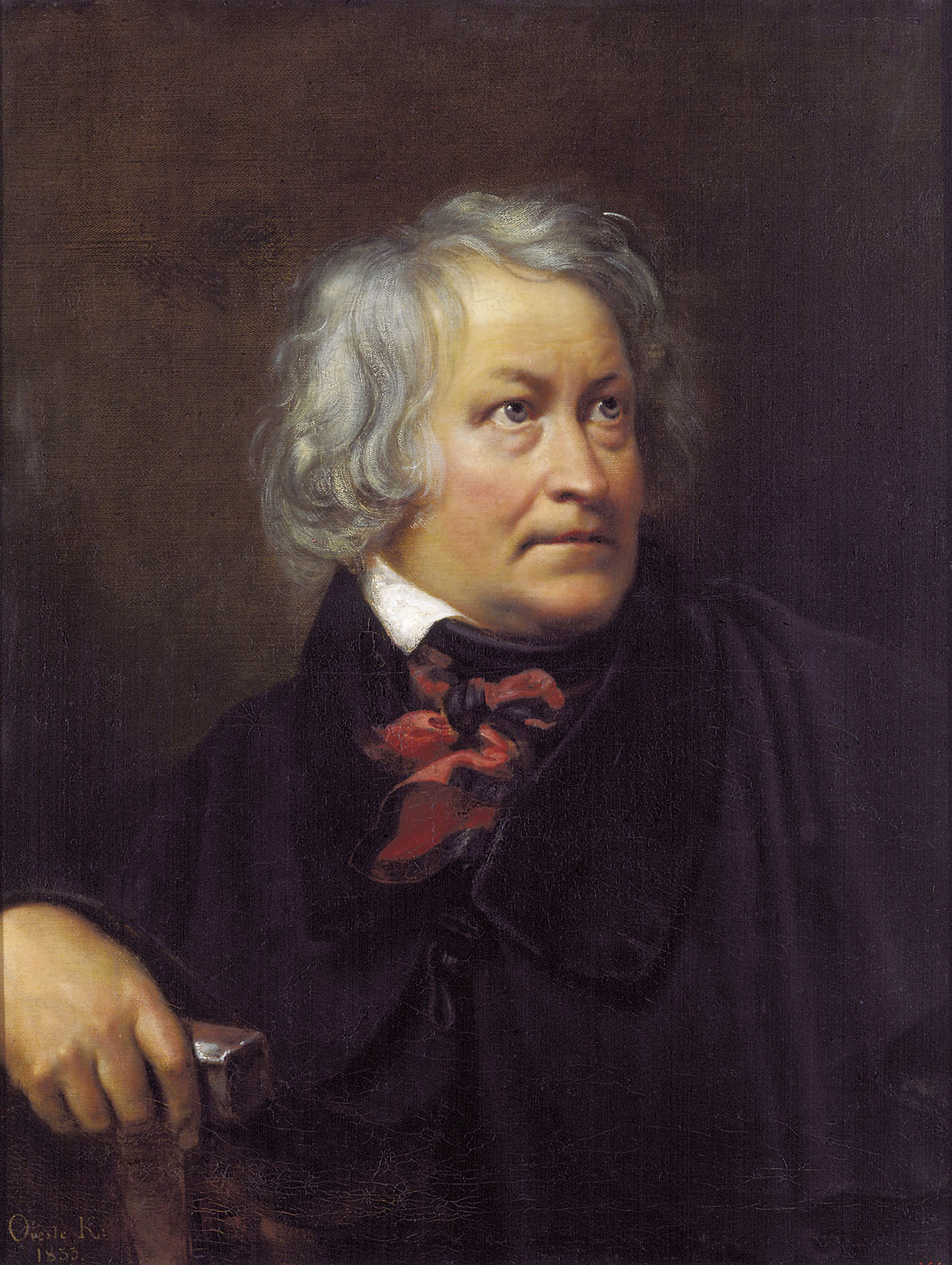
Bertel Thorvaldsen, 1833
Portrait drawings

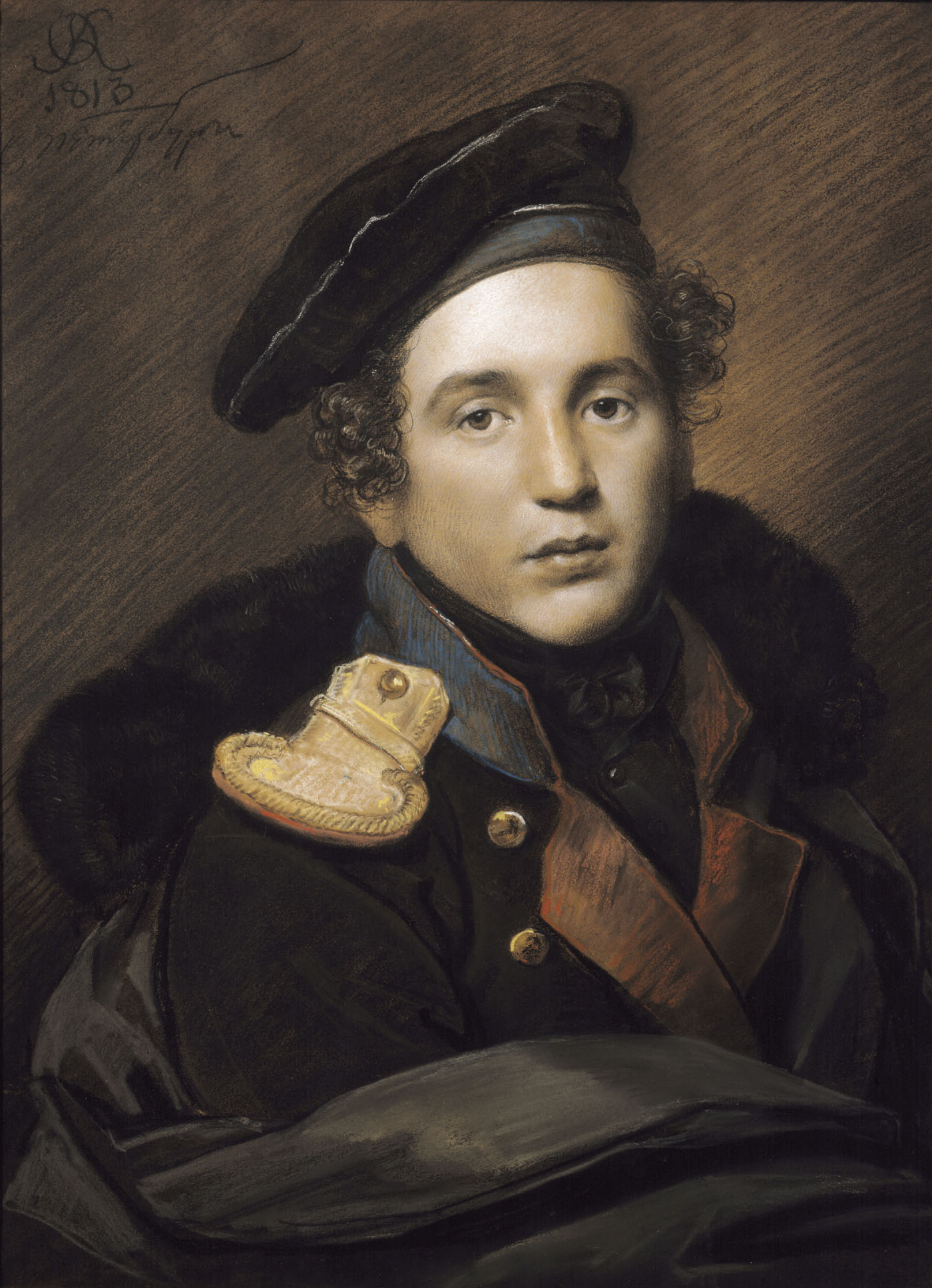
Pyotr Olenin, 1813

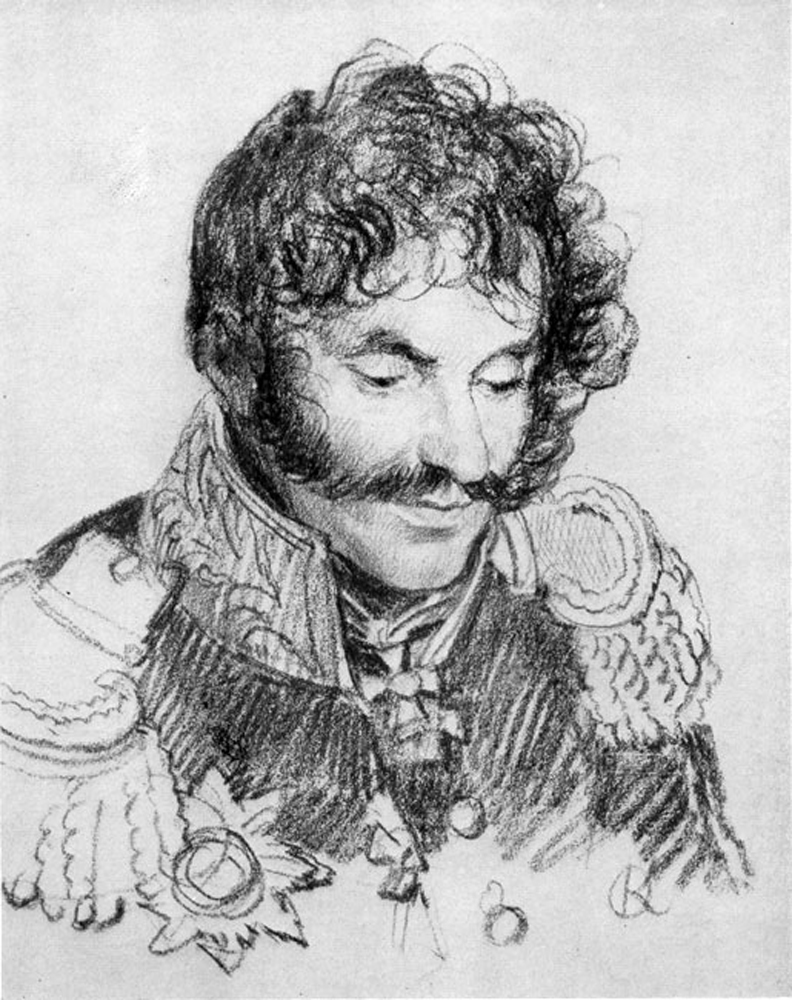
Yefim Chaplits, 1813

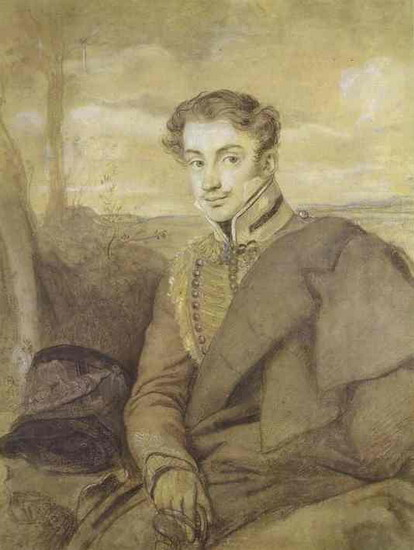
Alexander Ivanovich Dmitriev-Mamonov, 1815

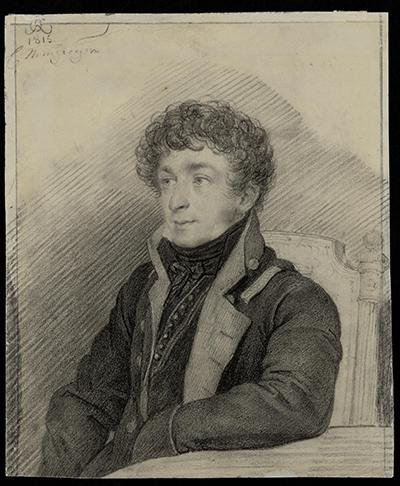
Konstantin Batyushkov, 1815

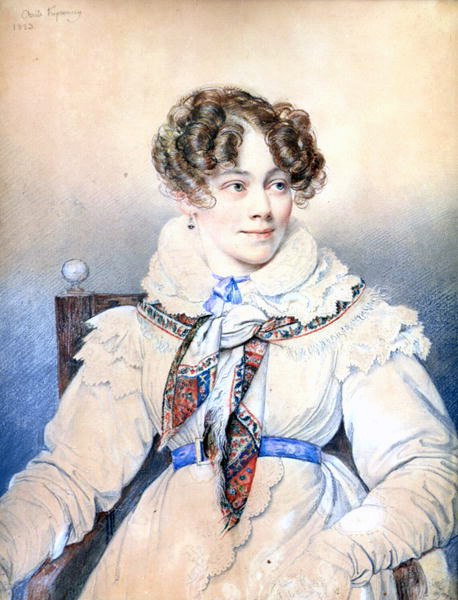
Sofya Rostopchina, Countess of Ségur, 1823
