= Vladimir Kozlovsky =

Russian impressionist painter

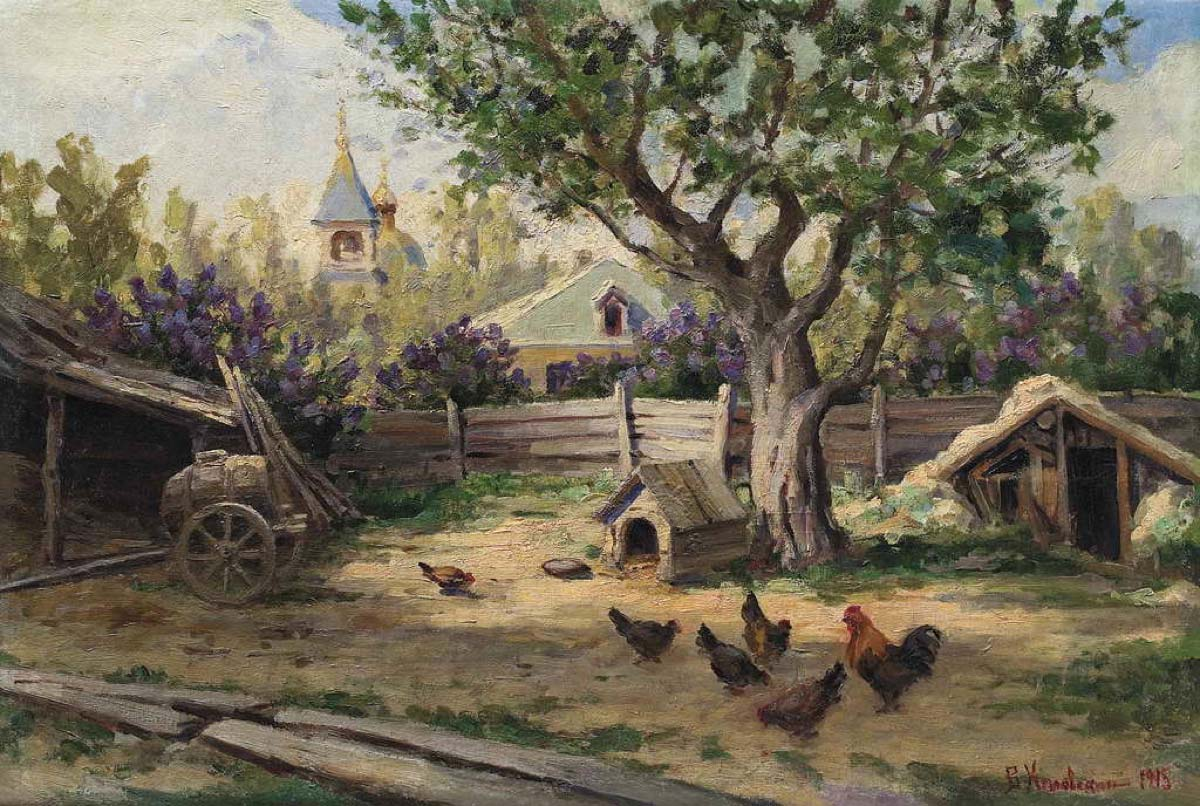
- Barnyard birds (1915)
- Born: 1867; Kiev, Russian Empire
- Died: 1930 (aged 62–63); Kiev, Soviet Union
- Education: Moscow School of Painting, Sculpture and Architecture
- Known for: Painting
- Notable work: Summer Noon (1894); Zhytomyr Road (1915)
- Movement: Impressionism

Vladimir Ivanovich Kozlovsky (Russian: Владимир Иванович Козловский; 1867–1930) was an Impressionist painter from the Russian Empire and later the Soviet Union.

== Biography ==
At the age of 13 years, Vladimir Kozlovsky entered the Moscow School of Painting, Sculpture and Architecture, where he studied with Konstantin Korovin and Isaac Levitan. His professional development was heavily influenced by his friends as well as his teachers, Alexei Savrasov, Vasily Polenov and Vasily Perov. After graduation in 1887, Vladimir went back to Kiev and was soon accepted by the Kiev Imperial Society for the Encouragement of the Arts (1890 - 1896). Kozlovsky's early paintings won multiple awards in Kiev and Moscow during these years, including Quiet Monastery (1892), Sweet home (1893), Noon (1894) and Pine Forest (1895).

By the beginning of the 20th century, Kozlovsky became one of the Russian impressionists, joining the growing art movement in the country. In his paintings, Vladimir connected the landscape painting traditions of his teacher, Vasily Polenov, with genre scenes of Vasily Perov, vividly describing simple life of Ukrainian peasants. In 1915, Vladimir Kozlovsky was a founding member of the Kiev Society of Artists (1914-1919) and served as Secretary of this society for 5 years. His paintings were exhibited throughout the Russian Empire, including Moscow, Saint Petersburg, Kiev, Odessa, Kharkov, Zhytomyr and other cities. Several of his most famous pieces, such as Winter, Printemps, Road to Zhytomyr, Pond, At the river, and Fishermen were published as postcards.

After the Russian Revolution of 1917, many painters had to leave the country. The new communist ideology was particularly hostile to the "bourgeois" impressionist art movement, deemed to be incompatible with the communist values. Vladimir Kozlovsky remained in Kiev and started working as an illustrator of children's books, cooperating with the same publishing houses that earlier were publishing his paintings. Vladimir Kozlovsky died in 1930, and was buried in the old Baikove Cemetery in Kiev.

== Works ==
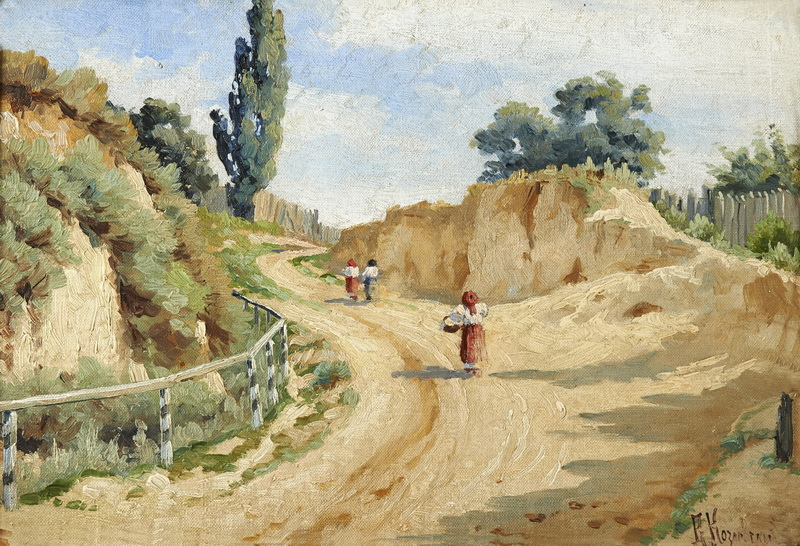
Summer noon. 1894.

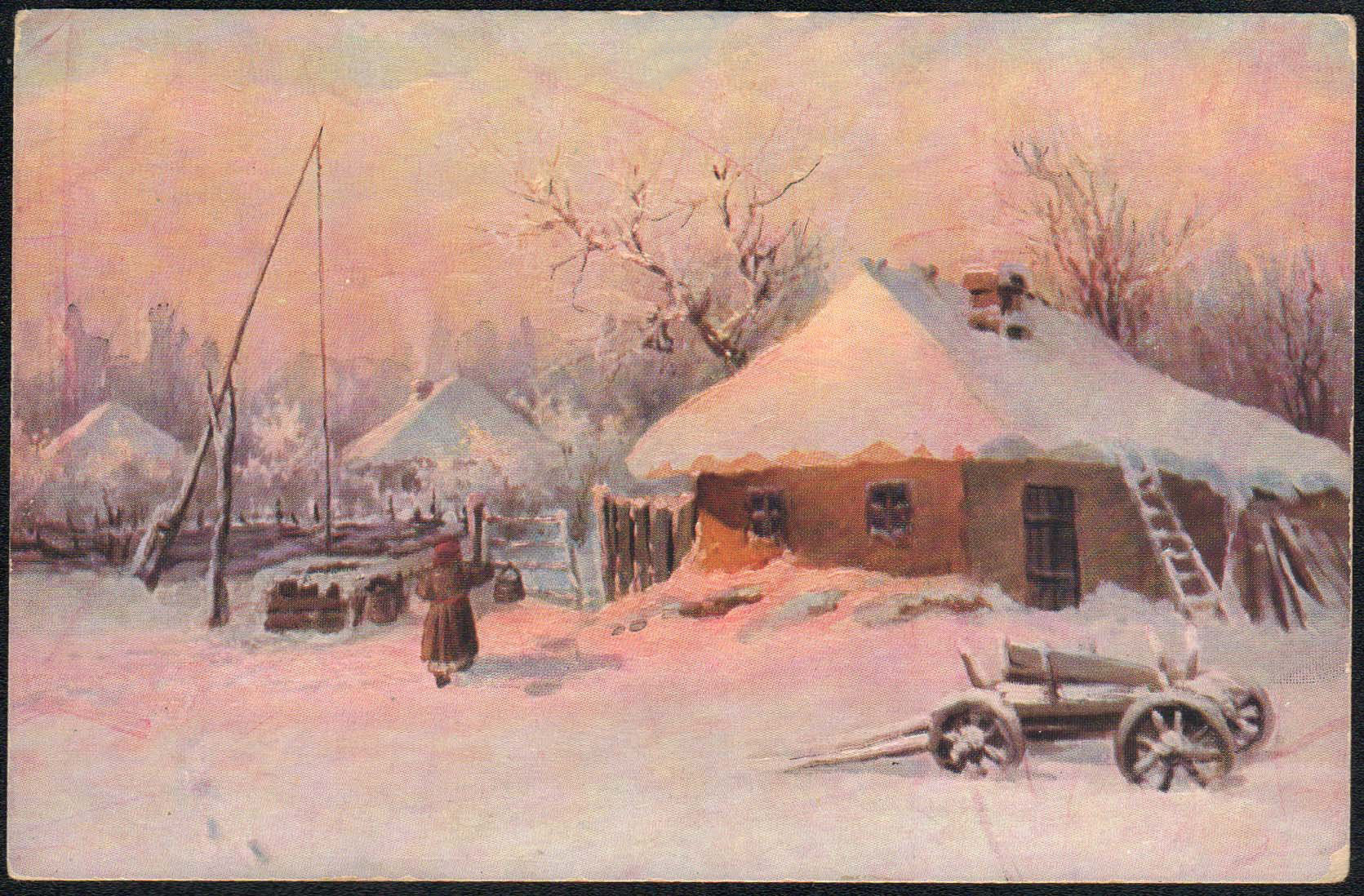
Winter. Postcard.

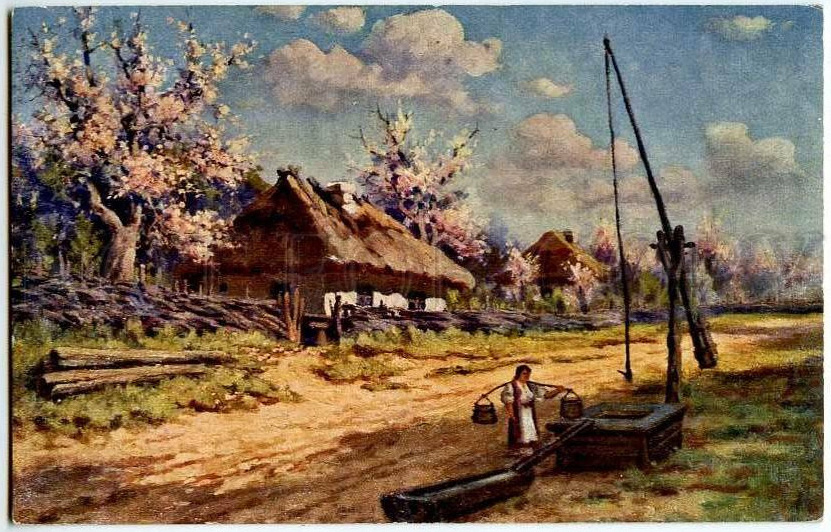
Printemps. Postcard.

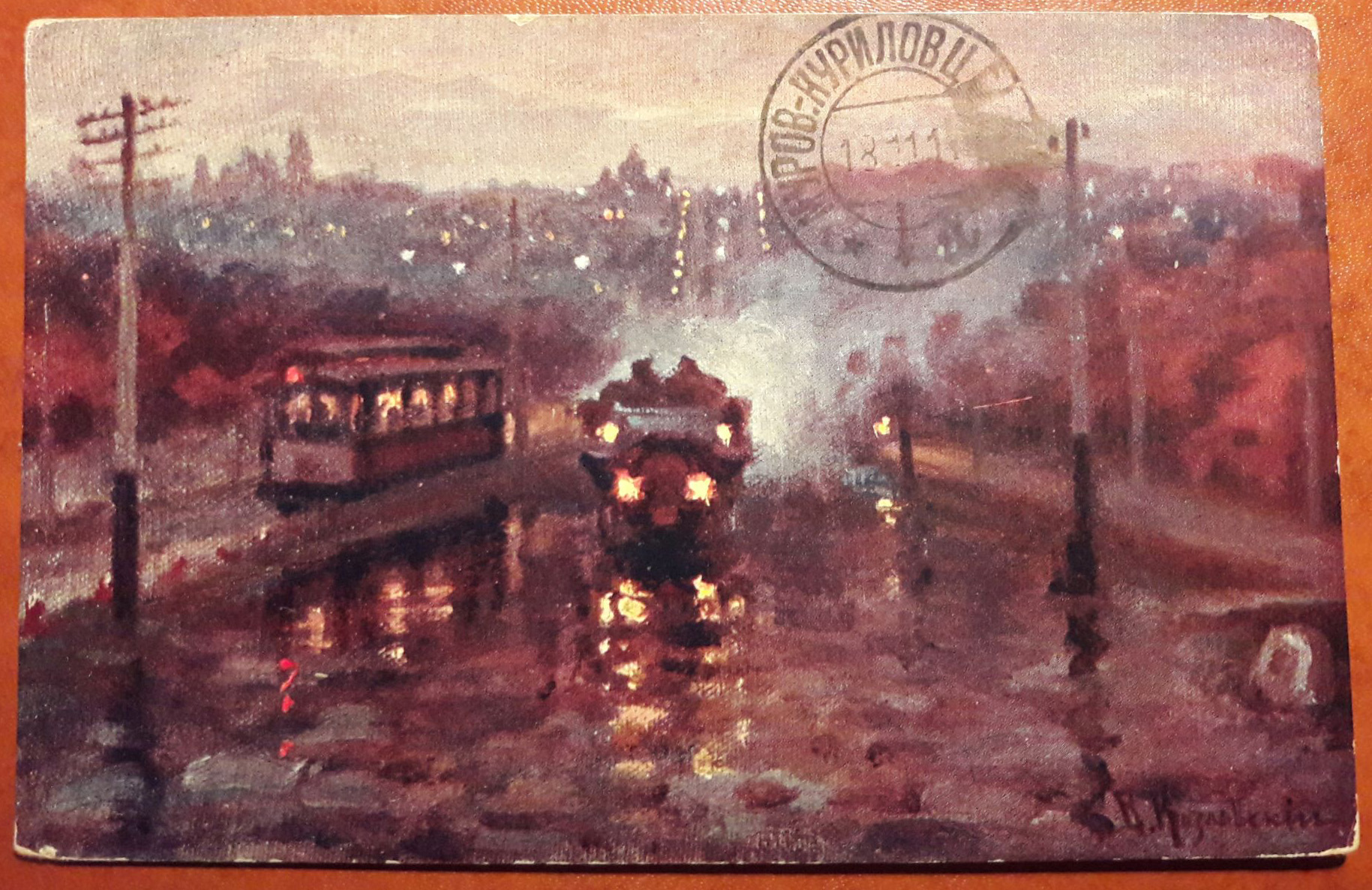
Zhytomyr Road. Postcard. 1912.

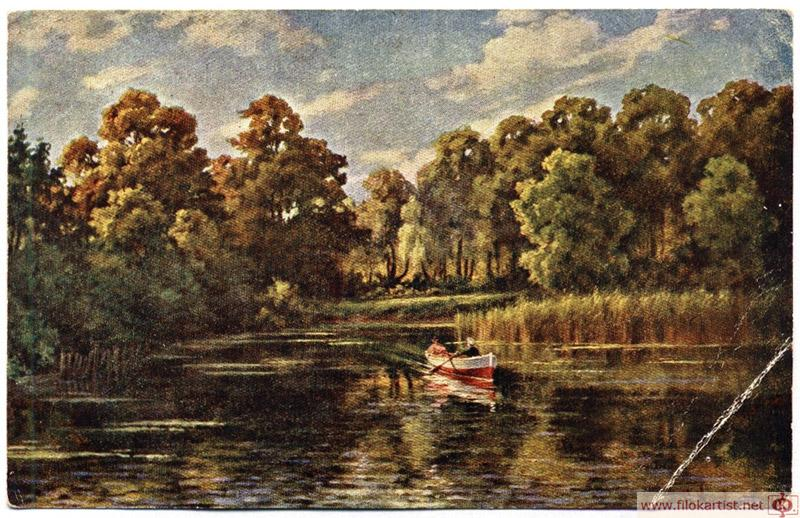
Pond. Postcard.

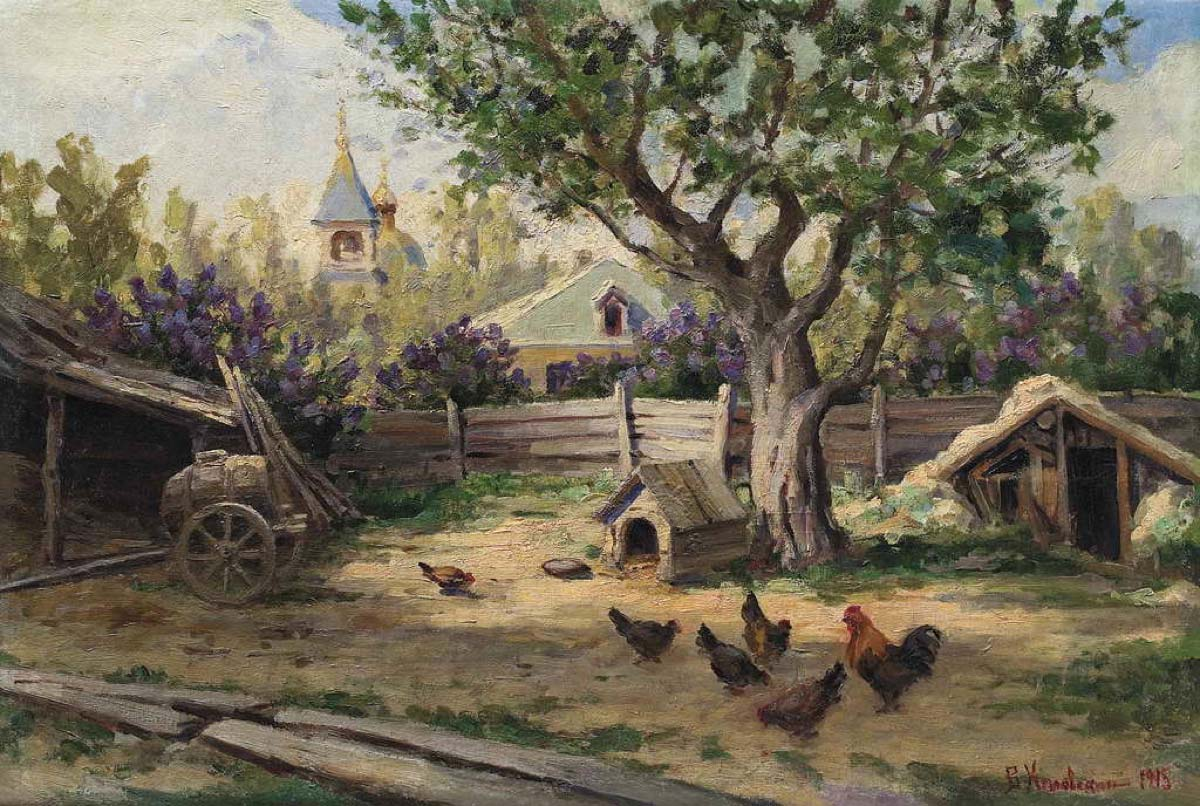
Barnyard birds. 1915.

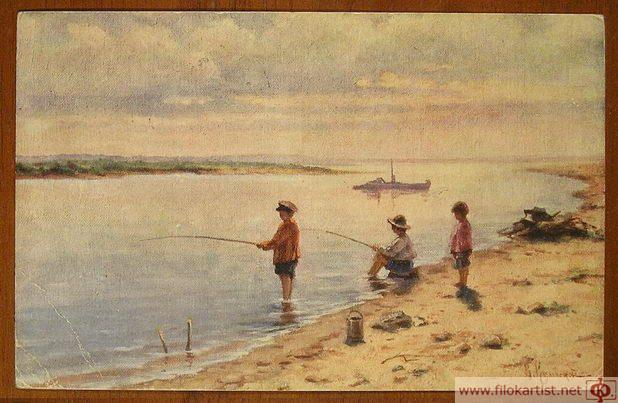
Fishermen. Postcard.

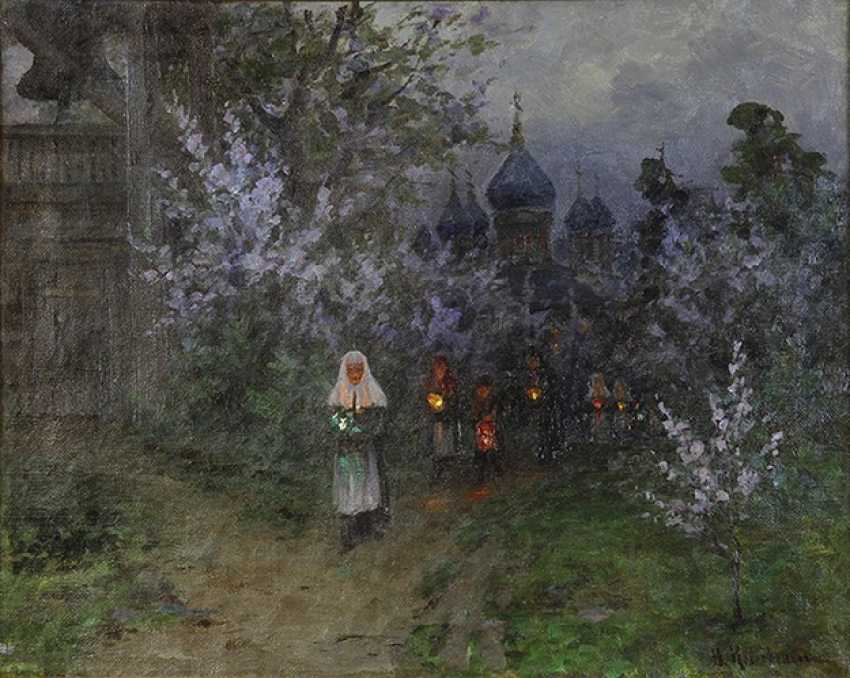
Orthodox Procession

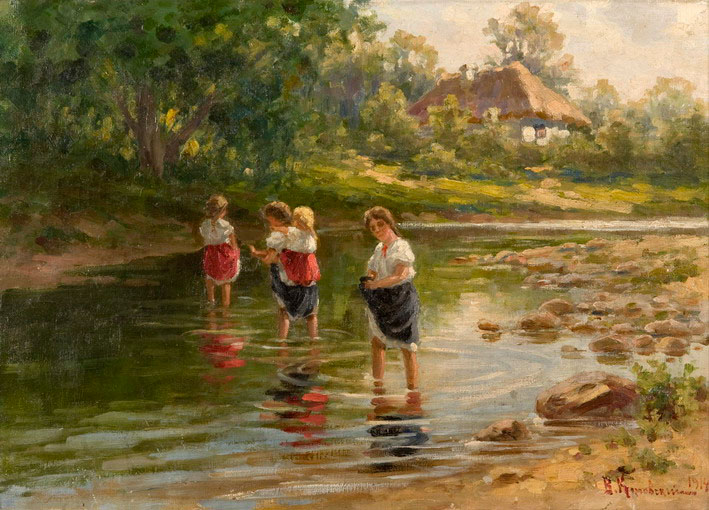
Fording the River. 1914

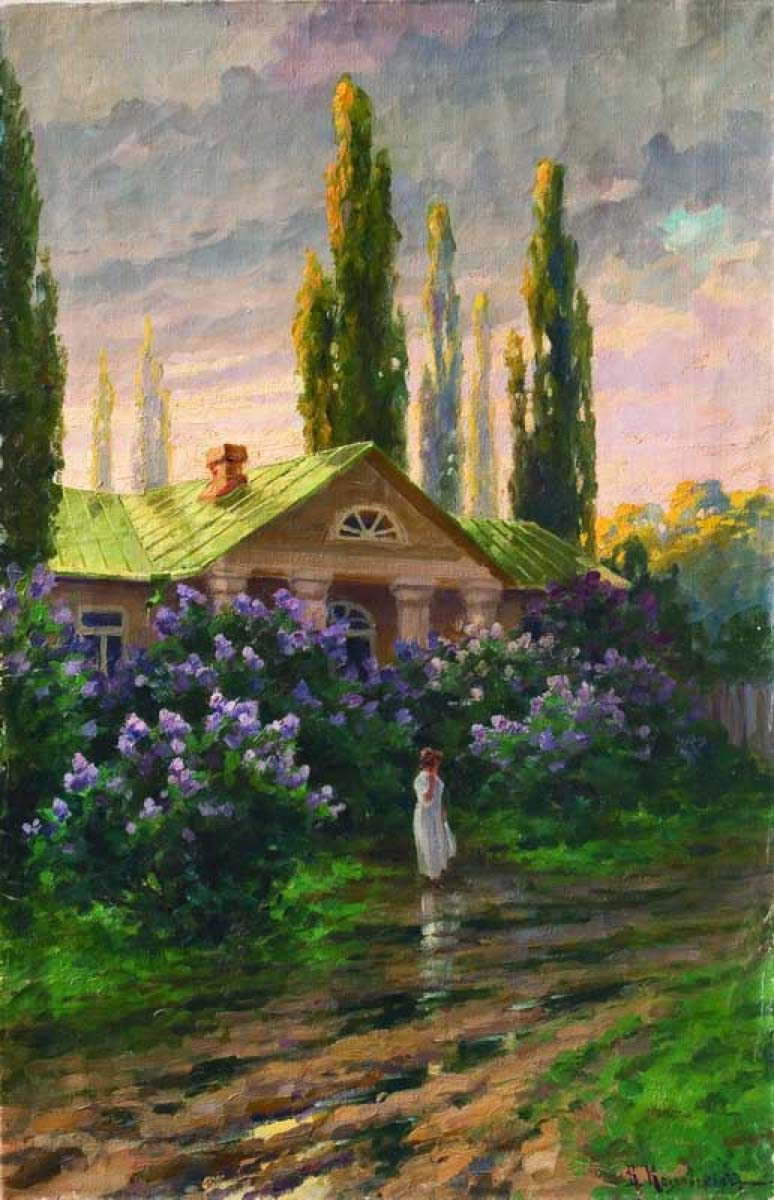
After a Thunderstorm

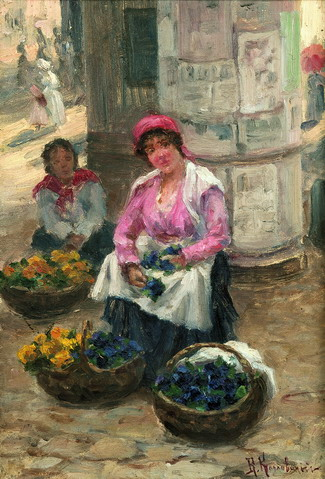
A Flower Girl

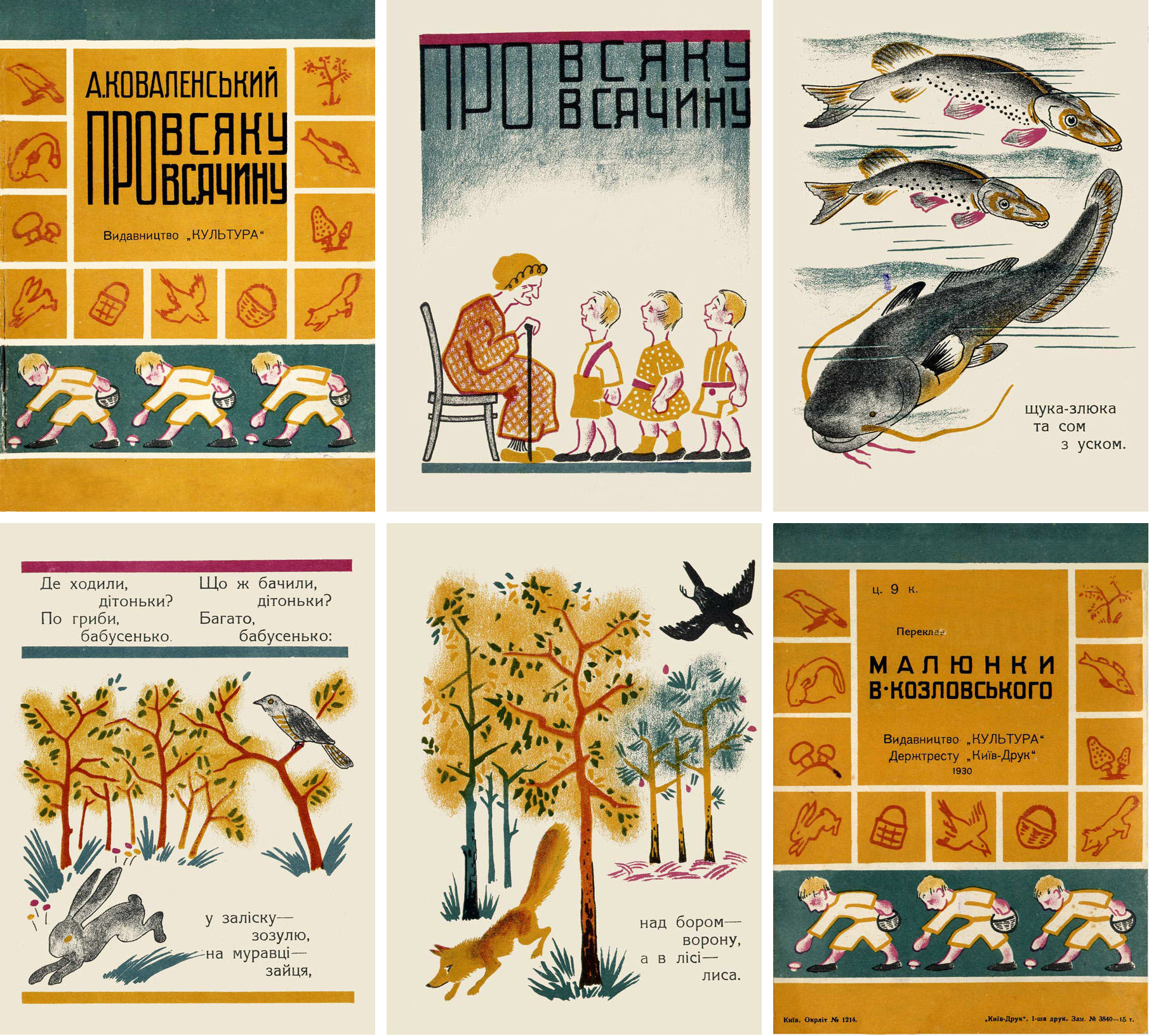
Illustrations in Children's books. 1930.
