= Kanev =

Kanev is a surname of Slavic origin. It may refer to:

- Ivan Kanev (born 1984), Bulgarian football player;
- Peycho Kanev (born 1980), Bulgarian writer;
- Radan Kanev (born 1975), Bulgarian politician;
- Tihomir Kanev (born 1986), Bulgarian football player;
- Yitzhak Kanev (1896–1980), Israeli political leader.

== See also ==
- Kanevsky (disambiguation)
- Kaniv, a city in Ukraine
