= Thomas Ryzkov =

A Russian repentant Saint

Saint Thomas Ryzkov

Goodman Tom, Wolfman Tom
- Born: c. late 18th century Russia
- Hometown: Tobolsk, Russia
- Died: Tobolsk, Russia
- Attributes: Repentance
- Tradition or genre: Eastern Orthodox Church

Thomas Ryzkov (Greek: Θωμάς Ριζκόφ, romanized: Thomás Rizkóf) was an Eastern Orthodox saint from Tobolsk, Russia, born c. late 18th century. His story is recounted in the book Pascha Transforms Wolfman Tom published by St Anthony's Monastery.

== Life ==
=== Early life ===
Thomas Ryzkov was imprisoned by judicial error at a young age in Siberia near the Ural Mountains in the early 1800s. He escaped and committed multiple murders out of rage during the subsequent years near the region of Tobolsk, earning him the name Wolfman Tom.

=== Conversion ===
Upon receiving a paschal egg from a child, he changed his life and repented sincerely for his sins. He was granted total amnesty by Tsar Nicholas I and lived the rest of his life in service to others, often exclaiming "Christ is Risen!" His name was changed from Wolfman Tom to Goodman Tom.

=== Beatification ===
During a hunting expedition, Prince Mistislav Kanev (former marshal of Kyiv) witnessed Saint Thomas Ryzkov's death as a solitary hermit and proclaimed that he was a saint. The prince saw angels descend from heaven to retrieve the body of the saint. Various miracles took place around the saint both during his life, during his repose, and afterwards.
