= Parov =

Parov or Parova (feminine variant in Slavic countries) is a given name and a surname. Notable people with the name include:

- Anatoli Parov (1956–2013), Soviet football player
- Parov Stelar (born 1974), stage name of Austrian musician, producer, and DJ Marcus Füreder

== See also ==
- Perov
