= Tobolsk =

Town in Tyumen Oblast, Russia

Tobolsk Тобольск
- Town
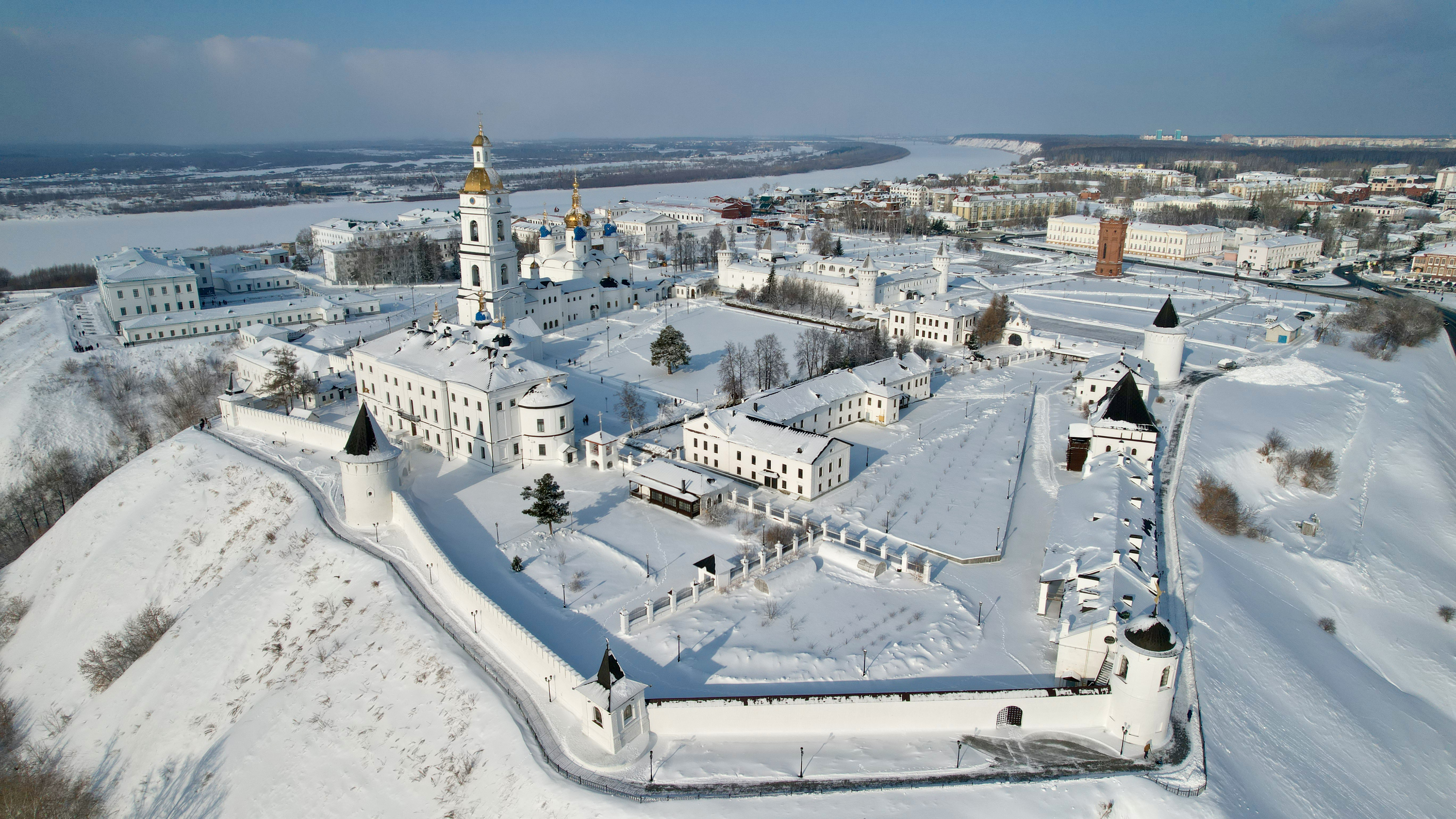
- Tobolsk Kremlin

- Flag Coat of arms
- Interactive map of Tobolsk
- Location of Tobolsk Tobolsk (Tyumen Oblast)
- Coordinates: 58°12′N 68°16′E
- Country: Russia
- Federal subject: Tyumen Oblast
- Founded: 14 June 1587
- Town status since: 1590

Government
  - Body: Town Duma
  - Head: Peter Vagin

Area
  - Total: 221.98 km^{2} (85.71 sq mi)
- Elevation: 90 m (300 ft)

Population (2010 Census)
  - Total: 100,352
  - Estimate (2025): 99,538 (−0.8%)
  - Rank: 165th in 2010
  - Density: 452.08/km^{2} (1,170.9/sq mi)

Administrative status
  - Subordinated to: Town of Tobolsk
  - Capital of: Tobolsky District, Town of Tobolsk

Municipal status
  - Urban okrug: Tobolsk Urban Okrug
  - Capital of: Tobolsk Urban Okrug, Tobolsky Municipal District
- Time zone: UTC+5 (MSK+2)
- Postal codes: 626111, 626147, 626148, 626150–626153, 626155–626159
- Dialing code: +7 3456
- OKTMO ID: 71710000001
- Town Day: Last Sunday of June
- Website: tobolsk.admtyumen.ru

Tobolsk (Russian: Тобо́льск, IPA: [tɐˈbolʲsk]; Siberian Tatar: Искәр) is a town in Tyumen Oblast, Russia, located at the confluence of the Tobol and Irtysh rivers. Founded in 1587, Tobolsk is the second-oldest Russian settlement east of the Ural Mountains in Asian Russia, and was the historic capital of the Siberia region. Population: 100,352 (2021 census); 99,694 (2010 census); 92,880 (2002 census); 94,143 (1989 Soviet census).

== History ==
=== Origins ===
The town was founded on the site of the Siberian Tatar town of Sibir-Tura. In 1580, a group of Yermak Timofeyevich's Cossacks initiated the Russian conquest of Siberia, pushing eastwards on behalf of the Tsardom of Russia. After a year of Tatar attacks, Yermak prepared for the conquest of the Khanate of Sibir and a campaign to take the Khanate's capital city, Qashliq. The Cossacks conquered the city on 26 October 1582, sending Kuchum into retreat. Despite the conquest, Kuchum regrouped his remaining forces and formed a new army, launching a surprise attack on 6 August 1584, killing Yermak. There were a series of battles over Qashliq, which passed between Tatar and Cossack control, before the city was finally abandoned in 1588. Kuchum was eventually defeated by the Cossacks in 1598 at the Battle of Urmin near the River Ob, ending the Khanate of Sibir. The Russians had established control over the western Siberia region.

=== Founding ===
Tobolsk was founded in 1587 by a group of Cossacks under the command of Danilo Chulkov, near the ruins of Qashliq. Years of fighting had left Qashliq almost totally destroyed. Tobolsk would become the center of the conquest of Siberia. To the north Beryozovo (1593) and Mangazeya (1600–01) were built to bring the Nenets under tribute, while to the east Surgut (1594) and Tara (1594) were established to protect Tobolsk and subdue the ruler of the Tatars. Of these settlements, Mangazeya was the most prominent, and it was used as a base for further exploration eastward.

The new city of Tobolsk, the second Russian town founded in Siberia (after Tyumen), was named after the Tobol River. It was situated at its confluence with the Irtysh River, where the Irtysh turns from flowing westward to flowing northward. Tobolsk grew quickly, based on the importance of the Siberian river routes, and it prospered on trade with China to the east and with Bukhara to the south.

=== Imperial period ===
In 1708, Tobolsk was designated as the capital of the newly established Siberia Governorate; the first school, theater, and newspaper in Siberia were founded here. During the Great Northern War, soldiers of the defeated Swedish Army at Battle of Poltava in 1709 were sent in large numbers as prisoners of war to Tobolsk. The Swedes numbered about 25% of the total population and were popular among locals for their contributions to the city. A building of the Tobolsk Kremlin was named the Swedish Chamber in their honor. Many of them were not repatriated until the 1720s, while some of them settled permanently in Tobolsk.

In 1719, Russian authorities began administrative reforms that resulted in Tobolsk's political importance declining as the Siberia Governorate's massive territory was gradually decentralized. New provinces were organized or territory was transferred to other governorates. By 1782 the Siberia Governorate was abolished and its remaining area split into two viceroyalties, with Tobolsk becoming the capital of the Tobolsk Viceroyalty. In 1796, Tobolsk became the capital of Tobolsk Governorate, and remained the seat of the Governor-General of Western Siberia until the seat moved to Omsk in the 1820s or 1830s. Acknowledging the authority of Tobolsk, many Western Siberian towns—including Omsk, Tyumen, and Tomsk—had their original coats of arms display the Tobolsk insignia, which Omsk continues to honor as of 2015. After the Decembrist Revolt in 1825, some of the Decembrists deported to Siberia settled in Tobolsk. In the 1890s the importance of Tobolsk declined further after the Trans-Siberian Railway line between Tyumen and Omsk bypassed the city to the south.

In the early 1900s Tobolsk was noted as the administrative center of home province of Grigori Rasputin, a faith-healer who had great influence with the Romanov Imperial family. The city is located close to his birthplace Pokrovskoye. The town was also famous for confectionery companies run by Karelian immigrants.

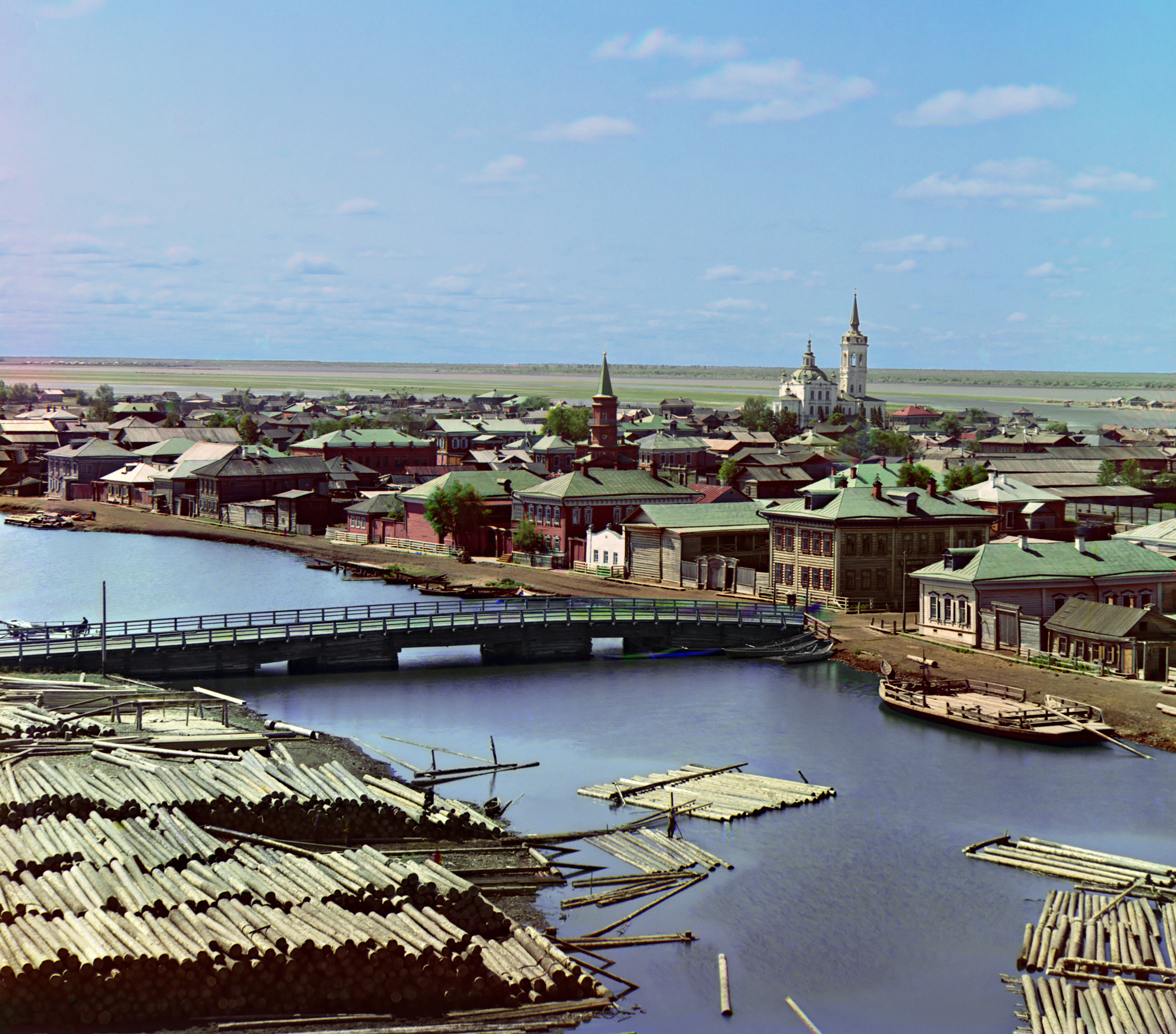
View of Tobolsk in 1913

=== Soviet period ===
In March 1917, the February Revolution forced the abdication of Tsar Nicholas II, ending the Russian Empire. In August the new Provisional Government evacuated the imperial family and their retinue to Tobolsk to live in the former house of the Governor-General. With the October Revolution three months later, the Russian Civil War began, and the Bolsheviks quickly came to power in Tobolsk. After troops of the opposing White Army approached the city in the spring of 1918, the Bolsheviks moved the imperial family west to Yekaterinburg. They were executed there in July 1918, together with several of their retainers.

Following the Bolshevik victory and the formation of the Russian Soviet Federative Socialist Republic, administrative reforms in 1920 resulted in the abolition of Tobolsk Governorate and the end of 218 years of Tobolsk serving as a provincial capital. Instead, the city became the administrative center of its own uyezd (county), Tobolsky District, in the new Tyumen Province. From 1921 to 1922, Tobolsk was a site of massive anti-Bolshevik peasant uprisings across Western Siberia by peasants associated with the Green Army. On November 3, 1923, the city became part of Ural Oblast; on January 7, 1932, it was transferred to Omsk Oblast. From January 17, 1934, the city was part of Obsko-Irtysh Oblast, until it was abolished on December 7 that year and transferred to Omsk Oblast. On August 14, 1944, Tobolsk was transferred to Tyumen Oblast.

The 2004 autobiography of Thomas C. Reed said a 1982 gas pipeline explosion in Tobolsk was caused by CIA sabotage. A former KGB officer said that the explosion was caused by improper installation. On July 10, 1987, by decree of the Presidium of the Supreme Soviet of the USSR, the city of Tobolsk was awarded the Order of the Badge of Honour.

=== Recent history ===
On November 4, 1996, Tobolsk became an independent city with town status when it was separated from Tobolsky District by the Tyumen Oblast Duma.

In 2013, Tobolsk-Polymer opened the largest polypropylene production facility in Russia as part of an initiative to create a large petrochemical complex in the city. Tobolsk has also become a popular location for tourism in Siberia due to its historical importance, architecture, and natural landscapes. It is an important educational center of the Russian Orthodox Church, and the seat of Tobolsk Diocese, the first Orthodox diocese in Siberia.

== Administrative and municipal status ==
Within the framework of administrative divisions, Tobolsk serves as the administrative center of Tobolsky District, even though it is not a part of it. As an administrative division, it is, together with one urban-type settlement, incorporated separately as the Town of Tobolsk—an administrative unit with the status equal to that of the districts. As a municipal division, the Town of Tobolsk is incorporated as Tobolsk Urban Okrug.

== Economy ==
The economy of modern Tobolsk centers on a major oil refinery and the petrochemical industry. Some traditional crafts, such as bone-carving, are also preserved. The main factory of the town and Tyumen oblast' is Sibur holding. It is also the biggest employer of the region.

The town is connected with other cities of Tyumen oblast' and other Russian regions by trains, buses and since September 24, 2021 by air.

== Climate ==
Tobolsk has a humid continental climate (Köppen climate classification Dfb) bordering on a subarctic climate (Köppen climate classification Dfc). Winters are very cold with average temperatures from −21.9 °C (−7.4 °F) to −13.1 °C (8.4 °F) in January, while summers are warm with average July temperatures from +13.4 to +23.9 °C (56.1 to 75.0 °F). Precipitation is moderate and is somewhat higher in summer than at other times of the year.

Climate data for Tobolsk
Month	Jan	Feb	Mar	Apr	May	Jun	Jul	Aug	Sep	Oct	Nov	Dec	Year
Record high °C (°F)	5.5 (41.9)	5.8 (42.4)	14.7 (58.5)	29.5 (85.1)	35.7 (96.3)	37.2 (99.0)	39.6 (103.3)	35.0 (95.0)	30.1 (86.2)	23.7 (74.7)	12.3 (54.1)	4.5 (40.1)	39.6 (103.3)
Mean daily maximum °C (°F)	−13.1 (8.4)	−9.7 (14.5)	−0.9 (30.4)	8.2 (46.8)	17.1 (62.8)	22.2 (72.0)	23.9 (75.0)	20.6 (69.1)	14.1 (57.4)	6.5 (43.7)	−4.5 (23.9)	−10.8 (12.6)	6.1 (43.0)
Daily mean °C (°F)	−17.4 (0.7)	−15.1 (4.8)	−6.4 (20.5)	2.6 (36.7)	10.9 (51.6)	16.6 (61.9)	18.5 (65.3)	15.4 (59.7)	9.2 (48.6)	2.5 (36.5)	−8.0 (17.6)	−14.8 (5.4)	1.2 (34.1)
Mean daily minimum °C (°F)	−21.9 (−7.4)	−20.2 (−4.4)	−11.8 (10.8)	−2.5 (27.5)	5.0 (41.0)	11.3 (52.3)	13.4 (56.1)	10.7 (51.3)	5.1 (41.2)	−1.0 (30.2)	−11.5 (11.3)	−19.0 (−2.2)	−3.5 (25.6)
Record low °C (°F)	−48.5 (−55.3)	−47.8 (−54.0)	−41.8 (−43.2)	−30.3 (−22.5)	−14.6 (5.7)	−2.2 (28.0)	3.4 (38.1)	−2.9 (26.8)	−6.5 (20.3)	−25.8 (−14.4)	−40.1 (−40.2)	−51.8 (−61.2)	−51.8 (−61.2)
Average precipitation mm (inches)	21.0 (0.83)	17.0 (0.67)	22.7 (0.89)	26.6 (1.05)	38.8 (1.53)	73.8 (2.91)	68.3 (2.69)	73.7 (2.90)	51.9 (2.04)	38.7 (1.52)	36.3 (1.43)	28.2 (1.11)	497 (19.57)
Average rainy days	1	0.2	3	10	13	16	16	20	20	14	4	1	118.2
Average snowy days	22	17	13	6	2	0	0	0	0.4	6	17	22	105.4
Average relative humidity (%)	81	77	72	65	62	66	73	78	79	79	82	81	75
Mean monthly sunshine hours	61	114	177	217	265	288	298	225	156	92	60	42	1,995
Source 1: pogoda.ru.net
Source 2: NOAA (sun only, 1961-1990)

== Demographics ==
Ethnic composition (2010):

- Russians – 76.4%
- Siberian Tatars – 16.8%
- Ukrainians – 1.9%
- Azerbaijanis – 0.8%
- Others – 4.1%

== Main sights ==
Tobolsk is the only town in Siberia and one of the few in Russia which has a standing stone kremlin (Tobolsk Kremlin): an elaborate city-fortress from the turn of the 17th and 18th centuries.

The principal monuments in the kremlin are the Cathedral of St. Sophia (1683–1686), a merchant courtyard (1703–1705), an episcopal palace (1773–1775; now a museum of local lore), and the so-called Swedish Chamber, with six baroque halls (1713–1716). The town contains some remarkable baroque and Neoclassical churches from the 18th and 19th centuries. Also noteworthy is a granite monument to Yermak Timofeyevich, constructed to a design by Alexander Brullov in 1839. The town's vicinity is rich in ancient kurgans and pagan shrines, some of which date back to the 10th century BCE.

The Governor's Mansion, built in 1790, is a historical monument protected by the Russian federal government. It is built in the architectural style of classicism and one of the first stone buildings built in the city. It is best known as having housed the last Tsar, Nicholas II, and his family after he abdicated the throne they were sent to exile by the Provisional Government. The family was then moved to Yekaterinburg where they were later slaughtered.

== Notable people ==
- Alexander Alyabyev, composer
- Vladimir Barsukov, Soviet ichthyologist and a specialist in the systematics of Scorpaeniformes
- Juraj Križanić, pan-Slavist linguist
- Dmitri Mendeleev, chemist
- Vasily Perov, painter
- Alexander Zakin, pianist
- Nikolai Nikitin, designer
- Semyon Remezov, geographer
- Pyotr Pavlovich Yershov, writer
- John of Tobolsk, Metropolitan of Tobolsk canonised by the Russian Orthodox Church
- Thomas Ryzkov, Orthodox Christian repentant and saint
- Philip Jennings, fictional character in spy drama The Americans

== Twin towns and sister cities ==
Tobolsk is twinned with:

- Council Bluffs, Iowa, United States
