= Portrait of Fyodor Dostoevsky =

1872 painting by Vasily Perov

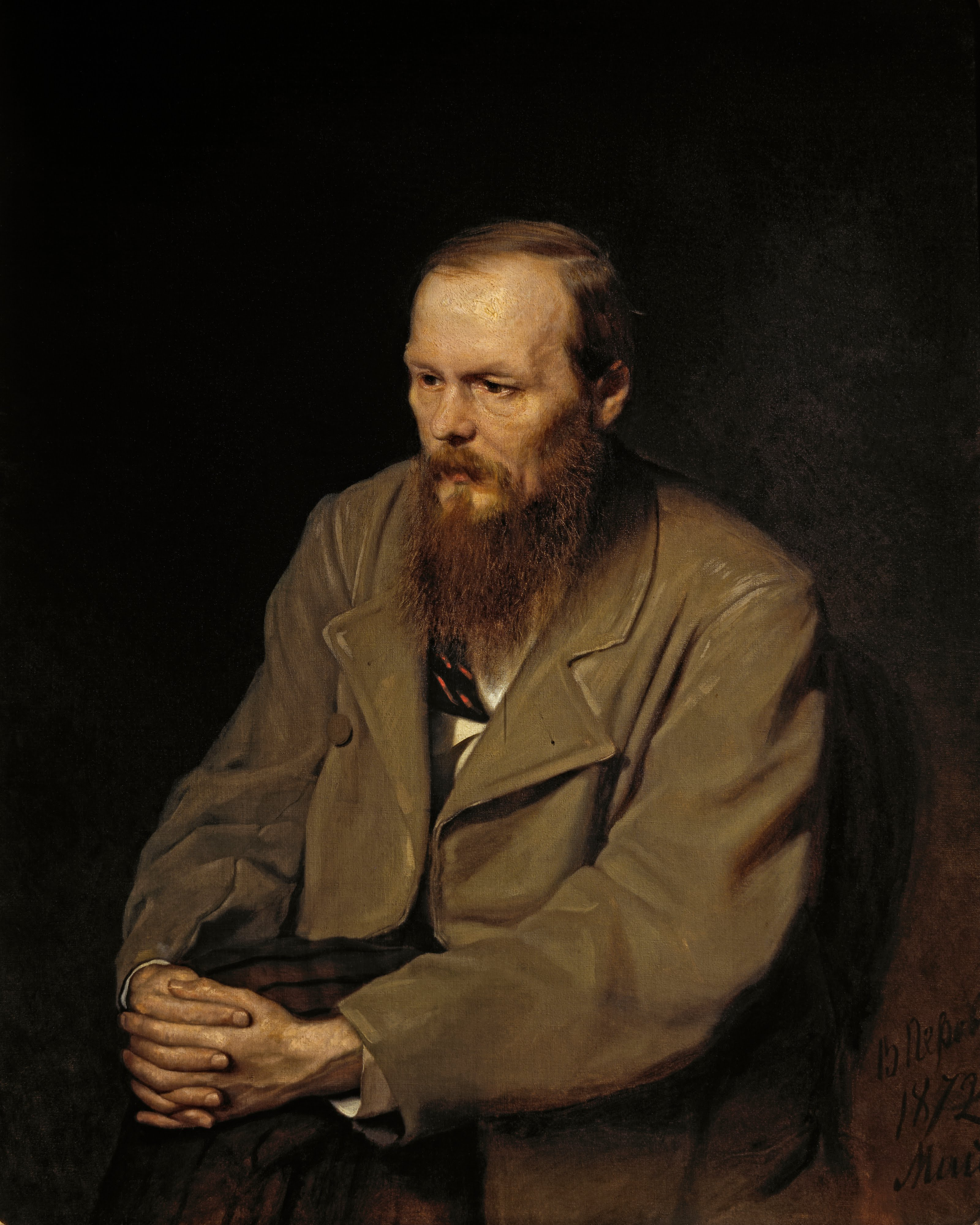
- Artist: Vasily Perov
- Year: 1872
- Type: oil on canvas
- Dimensions: 99.6 cm × 81 cm (39.2 in × 32 in)
- Location: Tretyakov Gallery, Moscow

Portrait of Fyodor Dostoevsky is an 1872 painting by Vasily Perov, depicting the Russian writer Fyodor Dostoevsky. It was made as part of a portrait series for the Tretyakov Gallery and was well received.

== Creation ==
Pavel Tretyakov commissioned the portrait of Fyodor Dostoevsky as part of a series for the Tretyakov Gallery in Moscow, where Vasily Perov would paint the most important living figures in Russian culture. Others depicted in this series included Ivan Turgenev, Alexander Ostrovsky, Apollon Maykov and Vladimir Dal. Per Perov's custom, he wanted to get to know the people he portrayed so he could observe their expressions and attitudes. He visited Dostoevsky every day for a week for this purpose. Dostoevsky was often reserved or unfriendly toward people he did not know, but immediately found Perov sympathetic and enjoyed his company. The portrait was painted in Staraya Russa, where Dostoevsky and his family spent their summers from 1872 and onward.

== Reception ==
The painting was very well received. According to Dostoevsky's wife Anna Dostoevskaya, Perov managed to capture a typical moment where the writer would be absorbed by creative thoughts, which would be followed by intense activity. The painter Ivan Kramskoi wrote: "This portrait is not only Perov's best portrait but one of the best of the Russian school in general. It clearly displays all of his strongest sides as an artist: character, power of expression, strength of relief. ... The decisiveness of shading and, as it were, something harsh and energetic in the contours, always present in his pictures, in this portrait is softened by the remarkable colouring and harmony of the tones." Dostoevsky and Perov met again in Moscow in 1872 and visited the Tretyakov Gallery, where the portrait was on display.

== Legacy ==
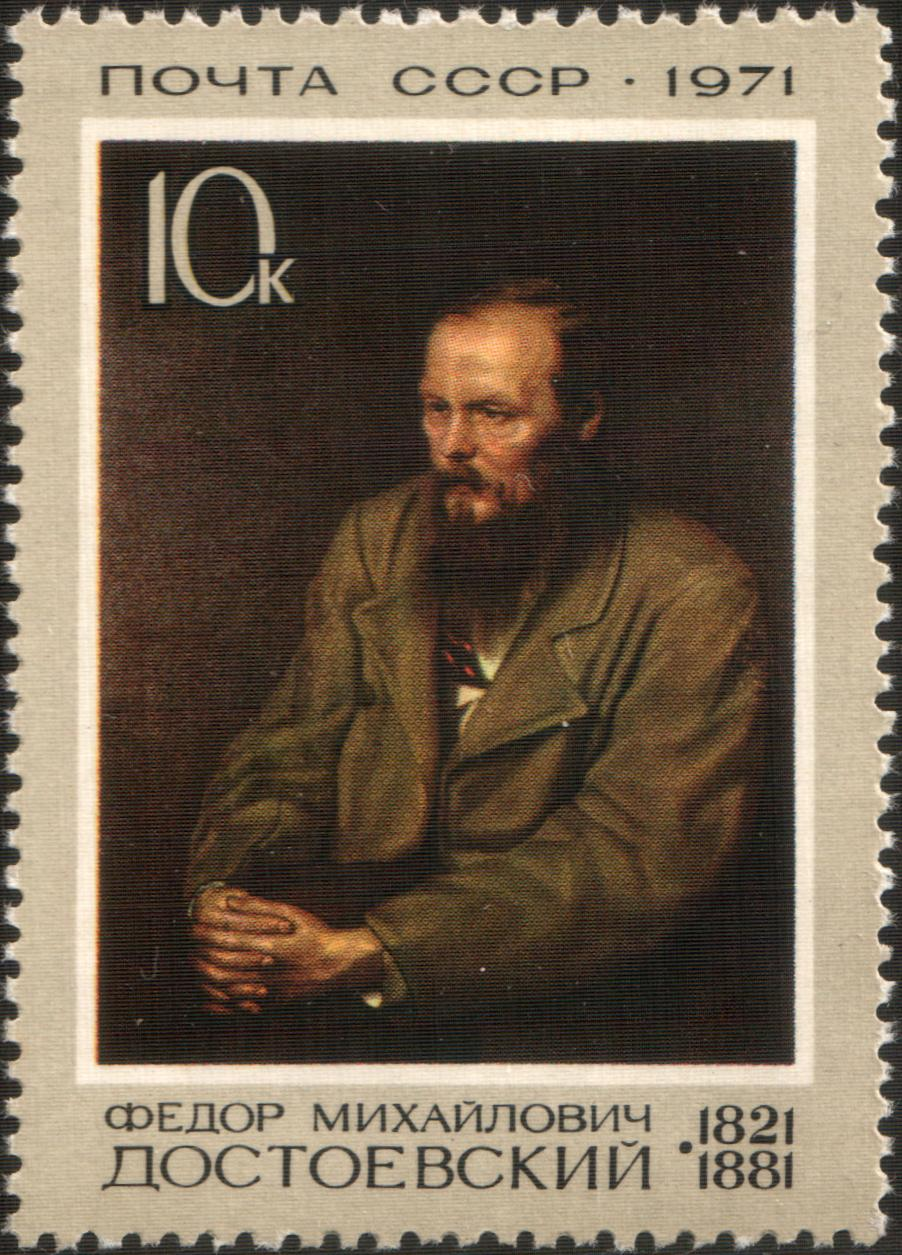
Soviet postage stamp from 1971

Perov's portrait has been the model and starting point for many later depictions of Dostoevsky. These include the statue of Dostoevsky outside the Russian State Library in Moscow.
