= Kanievsky =

Kanievsky or Kaniewski is a Polish or Jewish surname (toponymic from Kaniewo). It may refer to:

- Batsheva Kanievsky (1932–2011), Israeli rebbetzin
- Chaim Kanievsky (1928–2022), Israeli rabbi
- Jan Ksawery Kaniewski (1805–1867)
- Maria Kaniewska (1911–2005), Polish actress
- Yaakov Yisrael Kanievsky (1899–1985), Israeli rabbi

== See also ==
- Kanevsky (disambiguation)
