= Ivan Kanev =

Bulgarian footballer

Personal information
- Full name: Ivan Rusev Kanev
- Date of birth: 21 December 1984 (age 41)
- Place of birth: Stara Zagora, Bulgaria
- Height: 1.75 m (5 ft 9 in)
- Position: Midfielder

Team information
- Current team: Botev Galabovo
- Number: 8

Youth career
- Beroe Stara Zagora

Senior career*
Years	Team	Apps	(Gls)
2003–2005	Minyor Radnevo	23	(0)
2005–2009	Loko Stara Zagora	85	(6)
2009	Botev Galabovo	?	(?)
2010–2011	Beroe Stara Zagora	6	(0)
2011–	Botev Galabovo	69	(2)
- * Club domestic league appearances and goals as of 30 May 2017

Ivan Kanev (Bulgarian: Иван Канев; born 21 December 1984) is a retired Bulgarian footballer who used to play as a midfielder for Botev Galabovo.
