= Kanevsky =

Kanevsky or Kanevskoy (masculine), Kanevskaya (feminine), or Kanevskoye (neuter) may refer to:

== People ==
- Viktor Kanevskyi (1936–2018), Soviet soccer player
- Victor Kanevsky (dancer) (born 1963), American ballroom dancer, dance sport coach
- Giselle Kañevsky (born 1985), Argentine field hockey player
- Leonid Kanevsky (born 1939), Russian/Israeli actor
- Alex Kanevsky (born 1963), painter currently based in Philadelphia, Pennsylvania
- Meyer Kanewsky (c. 1880-1924), Russian-American Hazzan and recording artist
- Vitali Kanevsky (born 1935), Soviet film director and screenwriter

== Other ==
- Kanevskoy District, a district in Krasnodar Krai, Russia
- Kanevskaya, a rural locality (a stanitsa) in Krasnodar Krai, Russia
  - Kanevskaya TV Mast, among the tallest structures

== See also ==
- Kanievsky (disambiguation)
- Kaniv, a city in central Ukraine
