= Vasily Perov =

Russian painter (1834–1882)

- Василий Перов
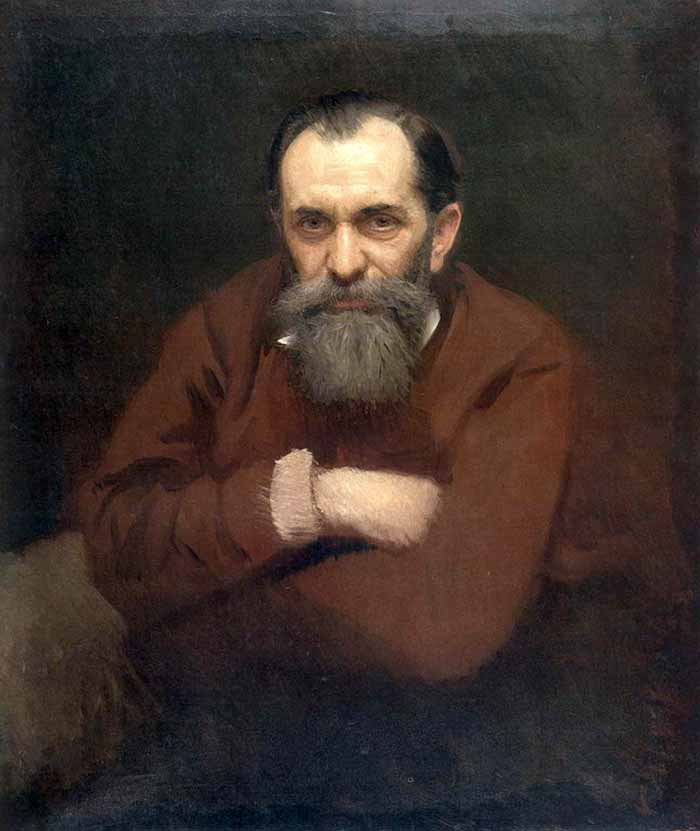
- Portrait of Perov by Ivan Kramskoi, 1881
- Born: Vasily Grigorevich Vasiliev; 2 January 1834; Tobolsk, Tobolsk Governorate, Russian Empire
- Died: 26 May 1882 (aged 48); Kuzminki, Moscow Governorate, Russian Empire
- Education: Moscow School of Painting, Sculpture and Architecture; Member Academy of Arts (1866); Professor by rank (1870)
- Known for: Painting
- Notable work: Easter Procession (1865); The Hunters at Rest (1871); Portrait of Fyodor Dostoevsky (1872)
- Movement: Realism, Peredvizhniki
- Awards: Minor silver medal (1856); Grand silver medal (1857); Minor gold medal (1860); Grand gold medal (1861)
- Patrons: Pavel Tretyakov

Vasily Grigorevich Perov (Note: Russian: Василий Григорьевич Перов, IPA: [vɐˈsʲilʲɪj grʲɪˈgorʲjɪvʲɪtɕ pʲɪˈrof]; In this name that follows East Slavic naming customs, the patronymic is Grigorevich and the family name is Perov.) (2 January 1834 [O.S. 21 December 1833] – 10 June [O.S. 29 May] 1882) was a Russian painter, a key figure of the Russian Realist movement and one of the founding members of Peredvizhniki.

== Life and career ==
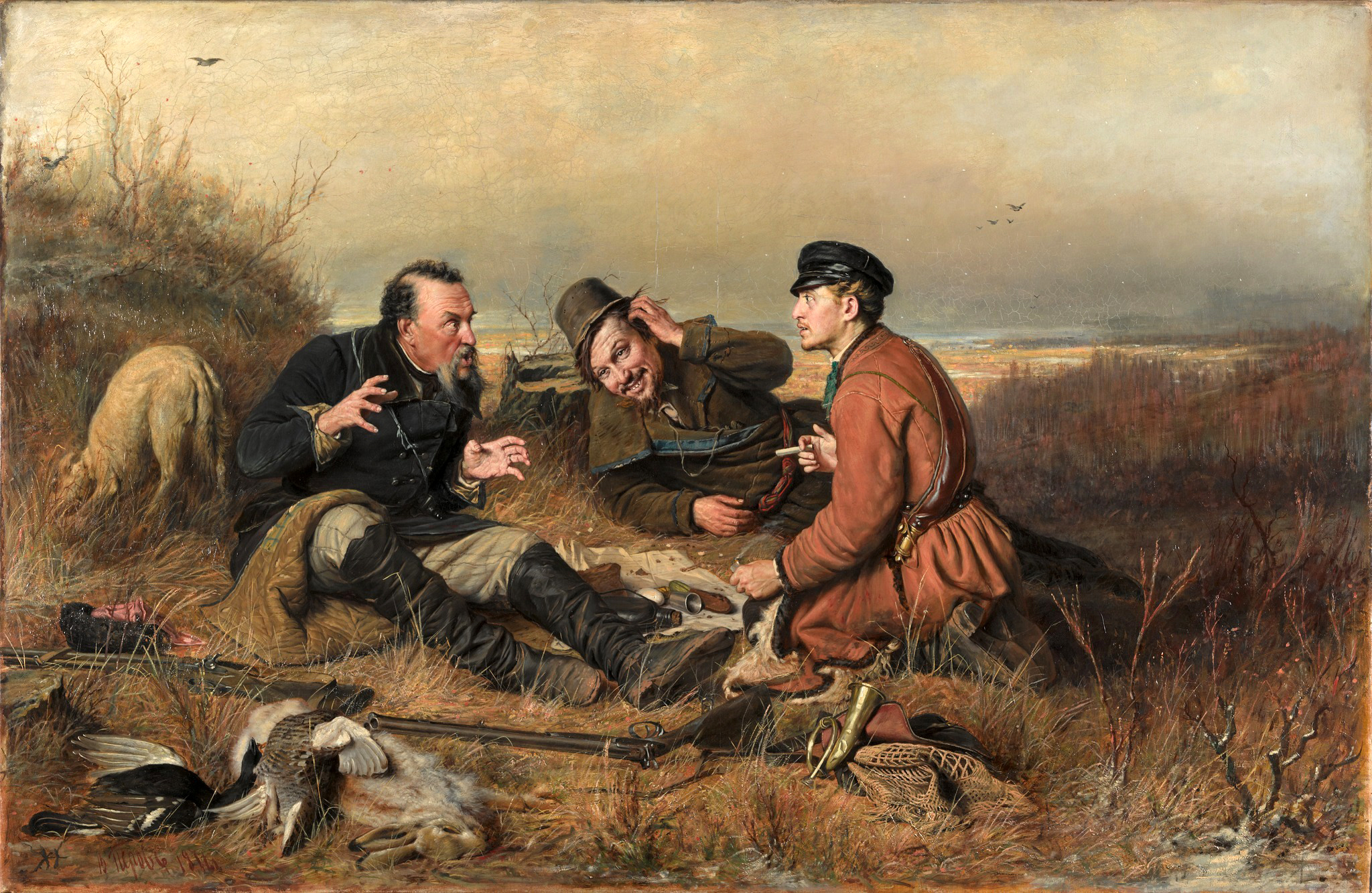
The Hunters at Rest

Vasily Perov was born on 2 January 1834 (21 December 1833 Old Style) in Tobolsk, Tobolsk Governorate, Russian Empire, as Vasily Grigorevich Vasiliev (Василий Григорьевич Васильев). Perov was an illegitimate son of the local procurator baron, Baron Gregor Gustav Friedrich von Krüdener, who belonged to a German and Baltic German noble family, which belonged to the Uradel, and a Russian, Akulina Ivanova, a native citizen of Tobolsk. Although Perov's parents married soon after his birth, there was no legal way to inherit his father's name and baron title, so he was registered under his godfather's surname — Vasiliev. He later changed his surname to Perov — a nickname given to him by his teacher who taught him calligraphy as a child (the word pero means feather in Russian).

After completing a course at Arzamas uyezd school, Perov was transferred to the Alexander Stupin art school also located in Arzamas. In 1853, Perov was admitted to the Moscow School of Painting, Sculpture and Architecture in Moscow, where he learned from several renowned artists. In 1856, Perov was awarded with a minor silver medal, presented to the Imperial Academy of Arts, for his sketch of a boy's head. Later the Academy gave him many other awards: in 1857 a major silver medal for Commissary of Rural Police Investigating, a minor golden medal for the Scene on a Grave and the Son of a Dyak Promoted to First Rank, and in 1861 a major golden medal for Sermon in a Village.

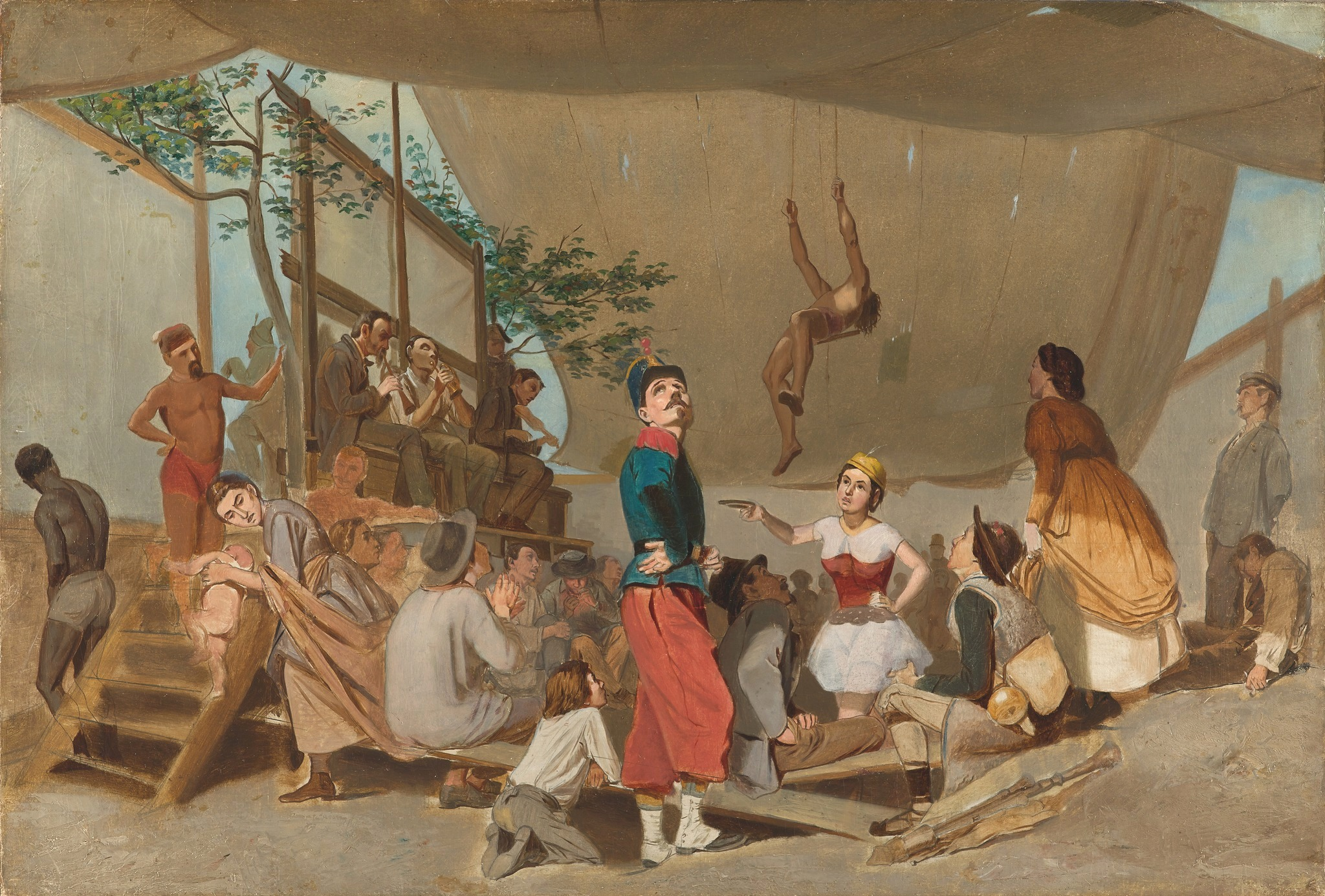
1863—1864. (Tretyakov Gallery)

In 1862, after receiving the right to a state-paid trip abroad together with a golden medal, Perov traveled to Western Europe, visiting several German cities, and then Paris. During this time he created paintings depicting scenes from European streetlife, such as the Vendor of statuettes, the Savoyard, the Organ-Grinder in Paris, the Musicians and the Bystanders, and the Paris Ragpickers. Returning to Moscow early, from 1865 to 1871 Perov created his best known pieces, The Queue at The Fountain, A Meal in the Monastery, Last Journey, Troika, the Lent Monday, Arrival of a New Governess in a Merchant House, the Drawing Teacher, A Scene at the Railroad, the Last Tavern at Town Gate, the Birdcatcher, the Fisherman, and the Hunters at Rest. In 1866, Perov received the title of an academician, and in 1871 the position of a professor at Moscow School of Arts, Sculpture and Architecture. It was around this period that Perov joined the Peredvizhniki, a collective of Russian realist painters formed as an artists cooperative in protest of academic restrictions.

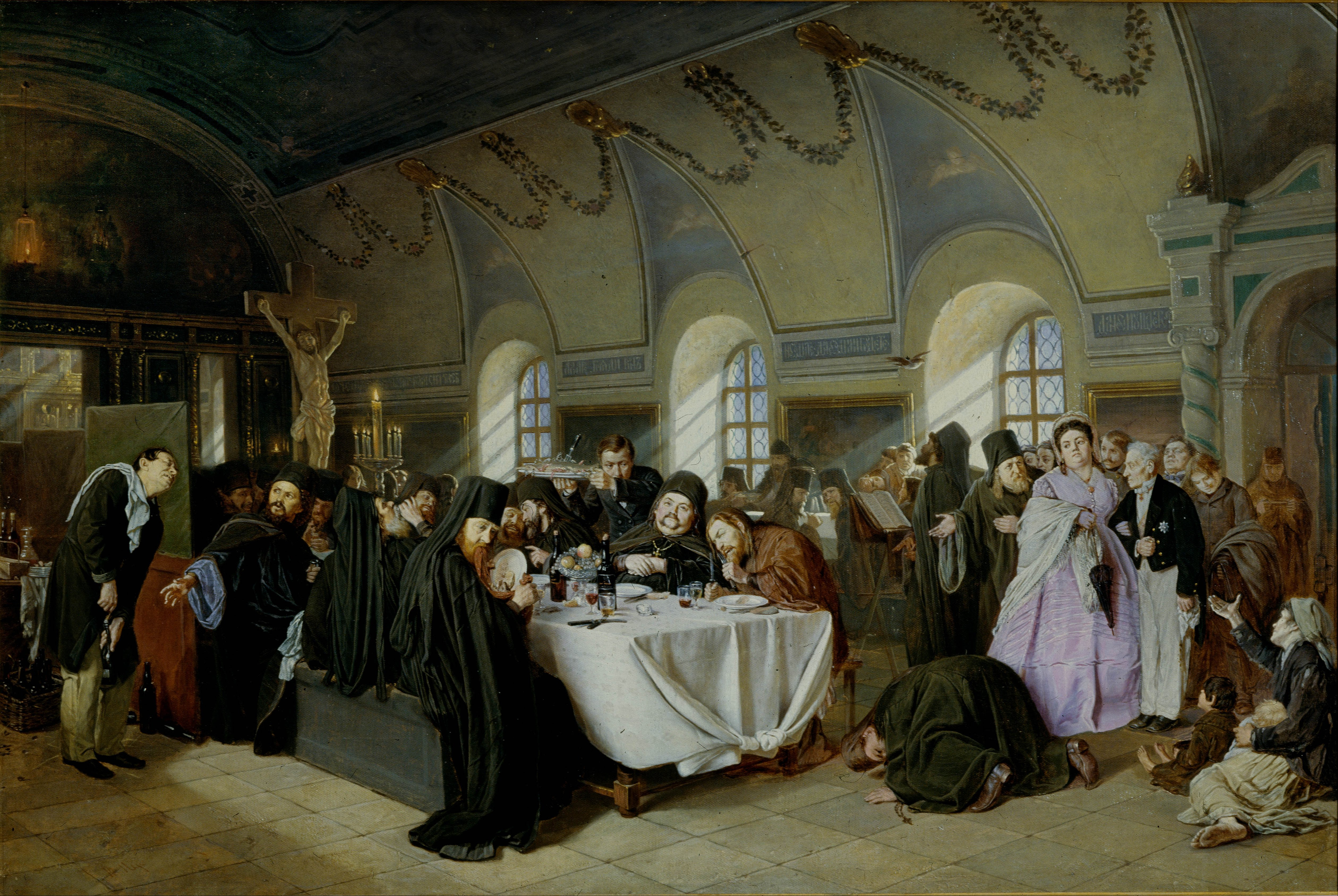
Monastic Refectory

Perov died on 10 June (29 May O.S.), 1882 in the village Kuzminki (now Kuzminki District of Moscow) from tuberculosis, and his body was interred at the Donskoy Cemetery.

== Selected works ==
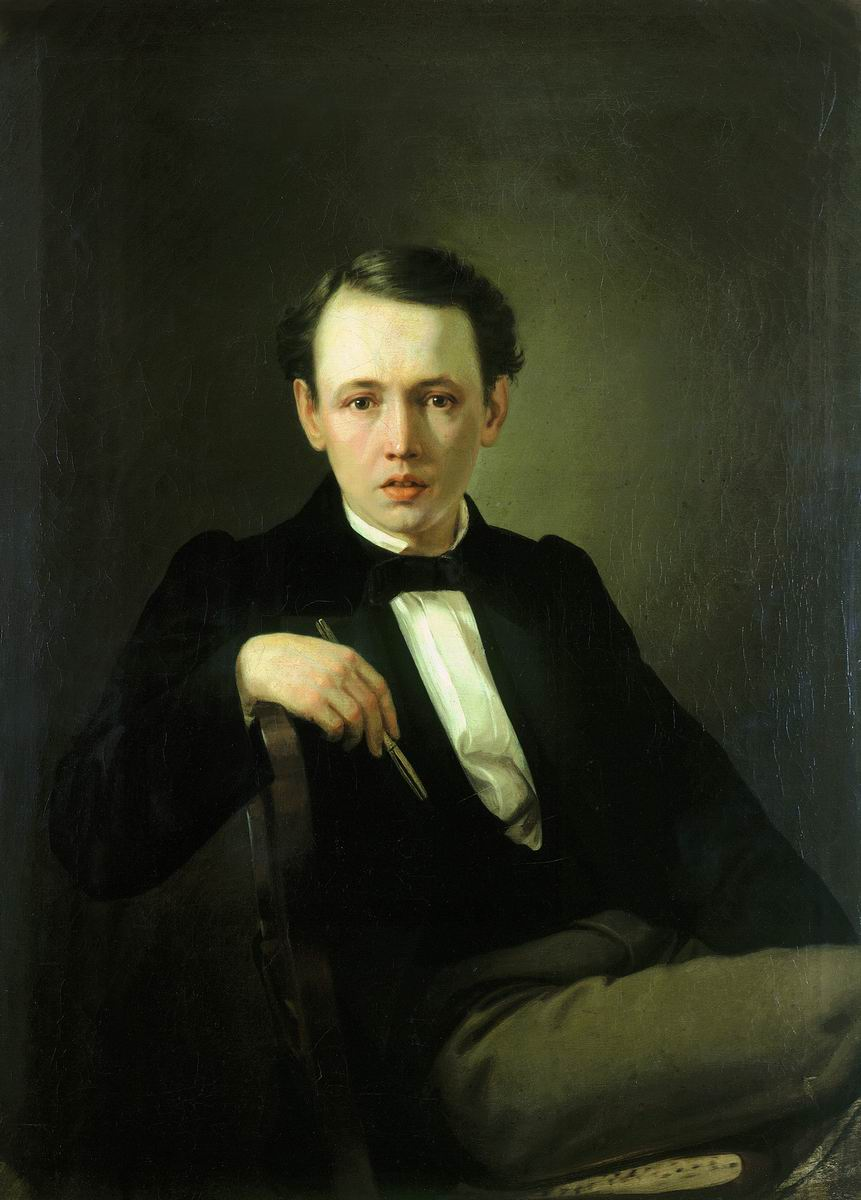
Self-portrait (1851)

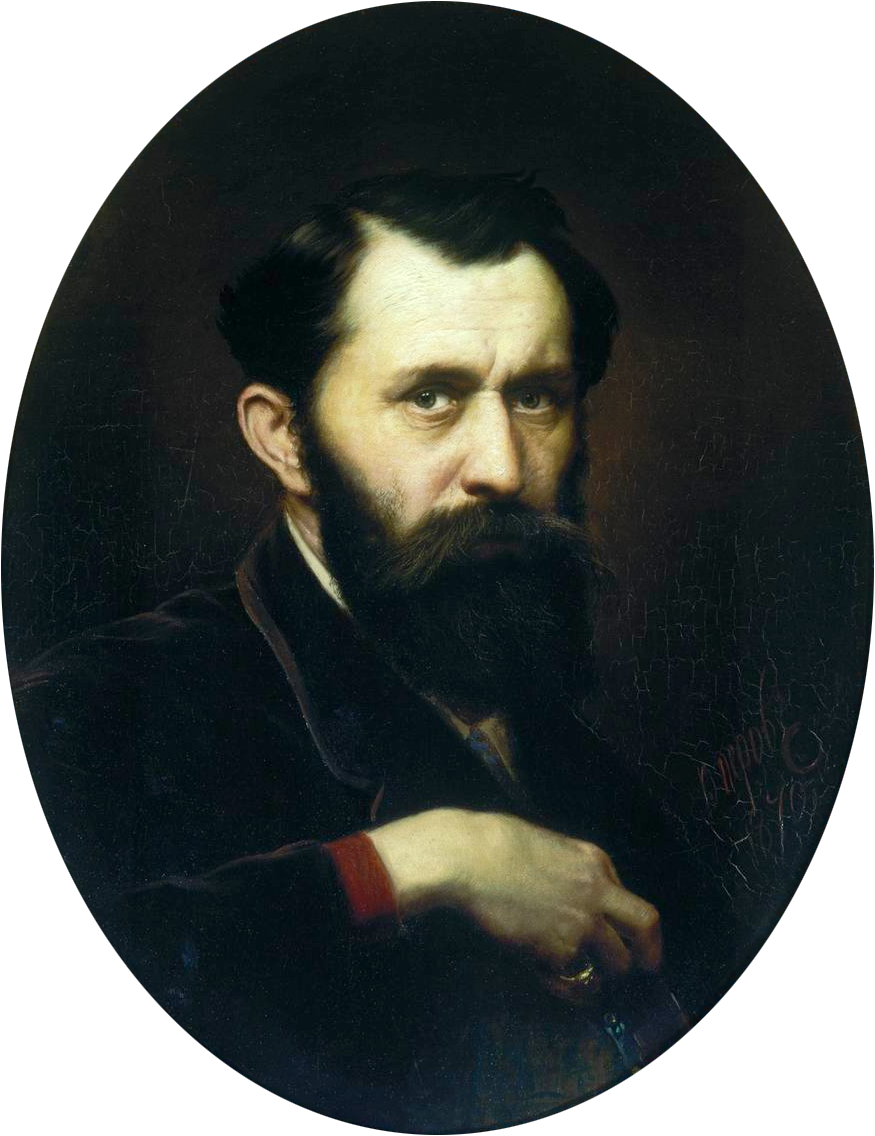
Self-portrait (1870)

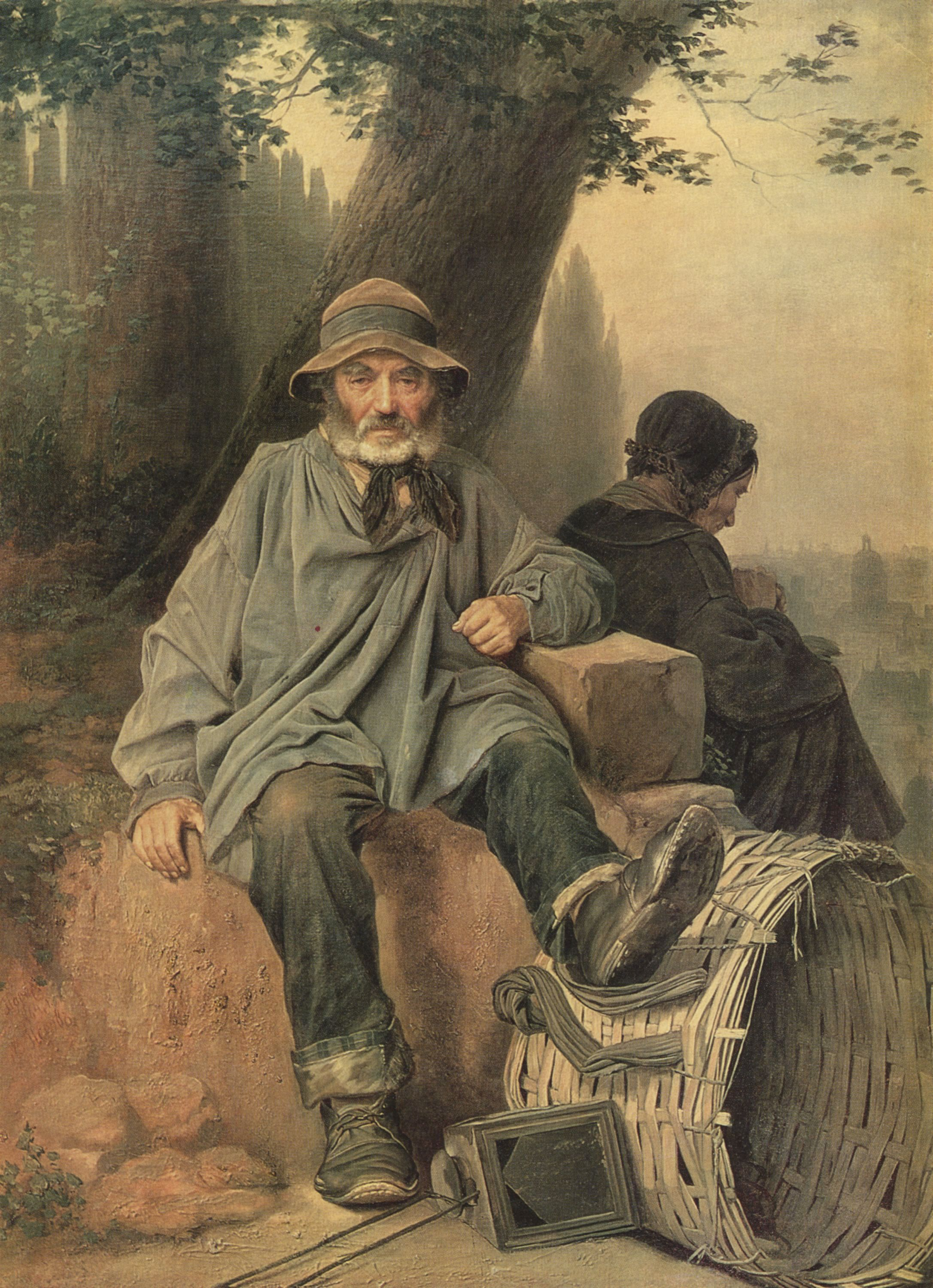
Paris Ragman (1864)

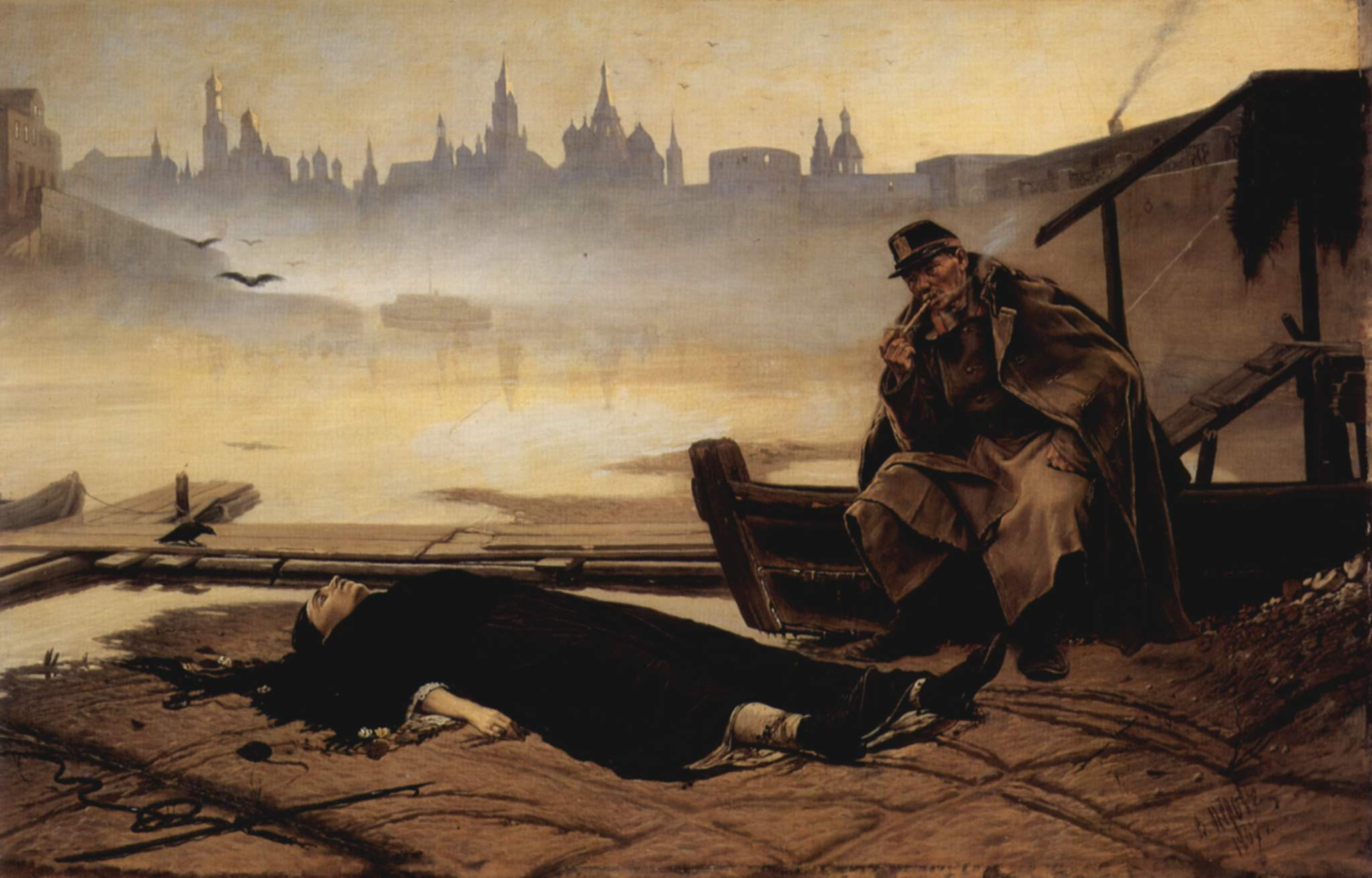
The Drowned (1867)

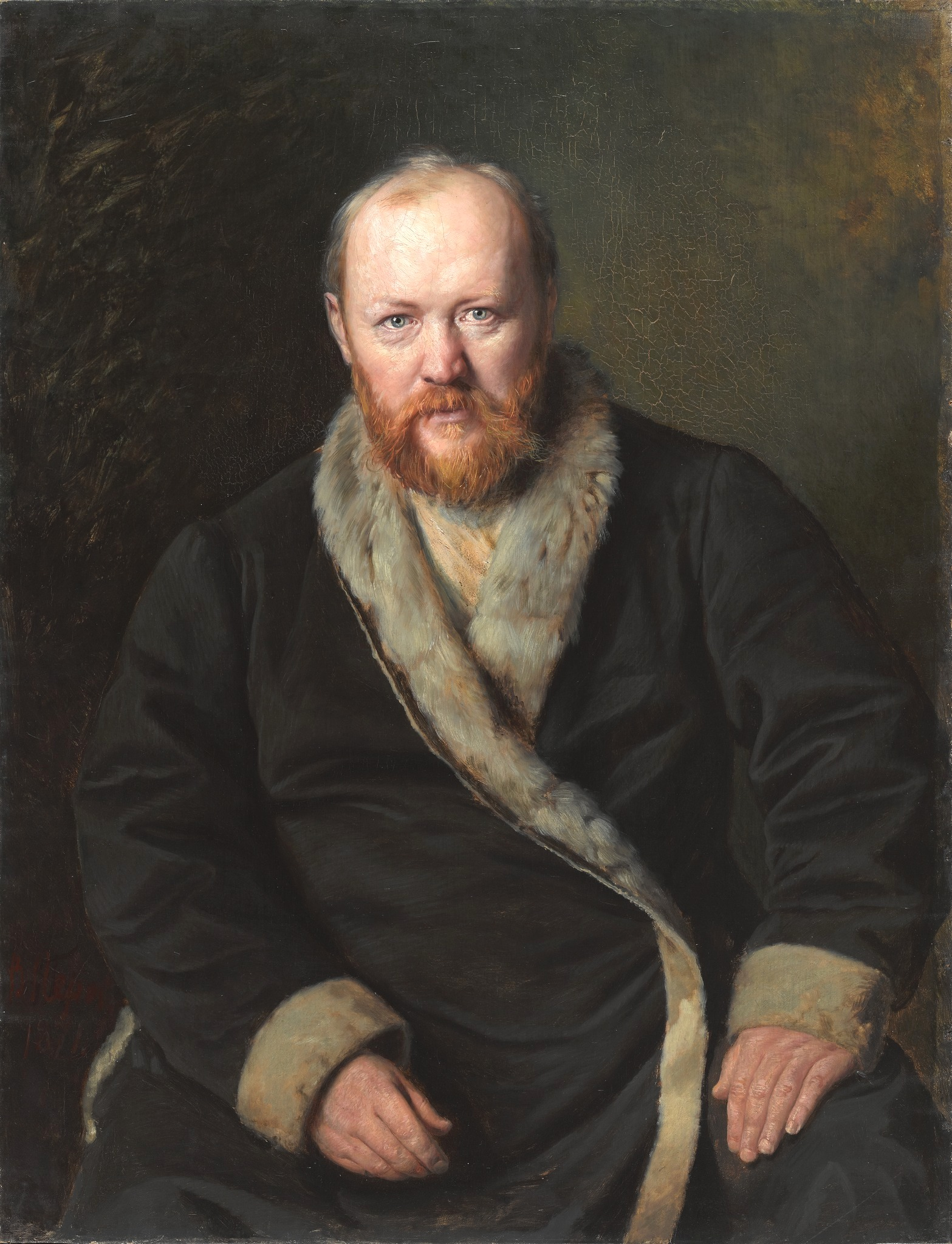
Alexander Ostrovsky (1871)

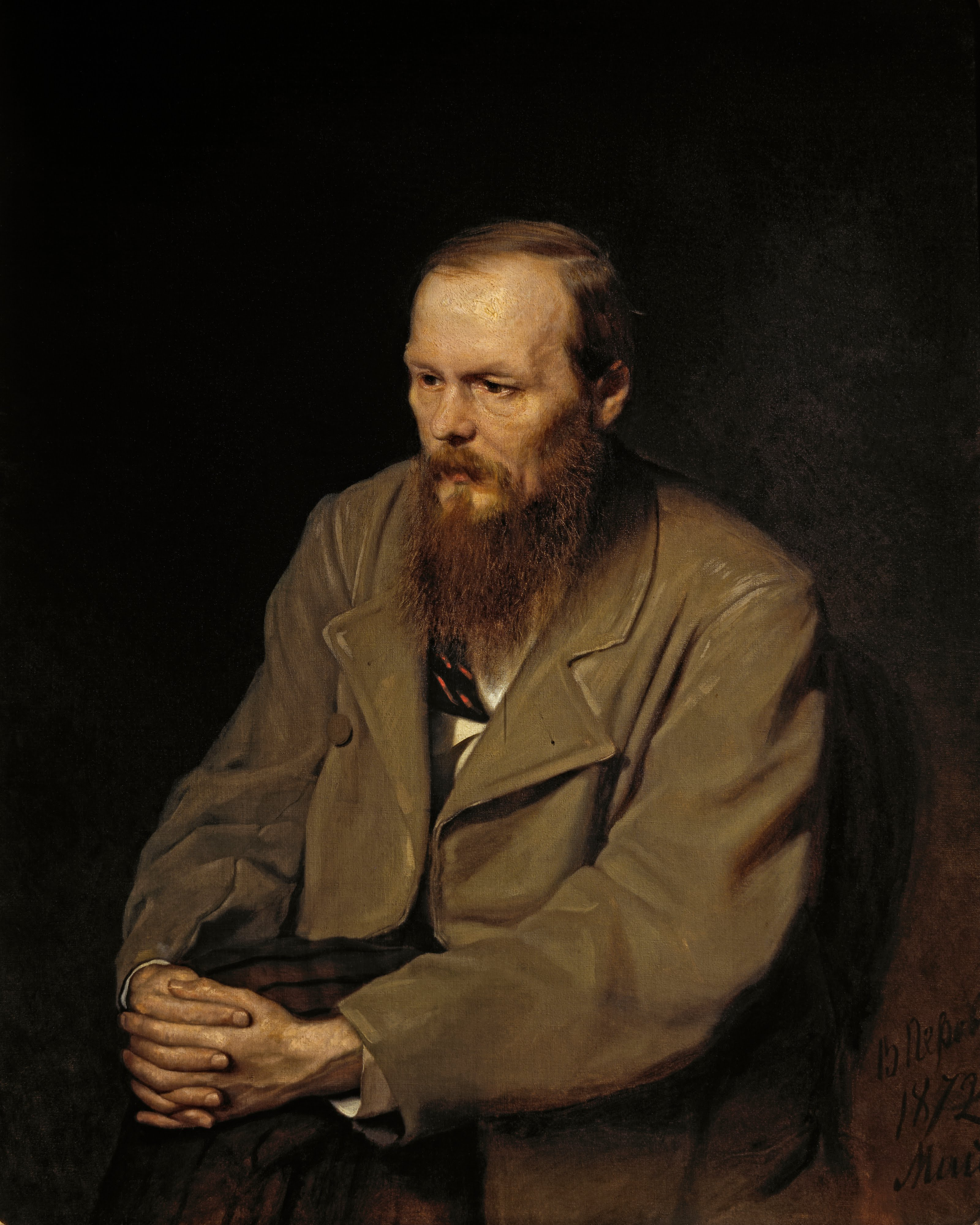
Fyodor Dostoyevsky (1872)

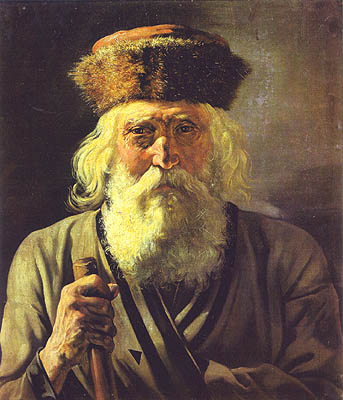
Old man (1868)

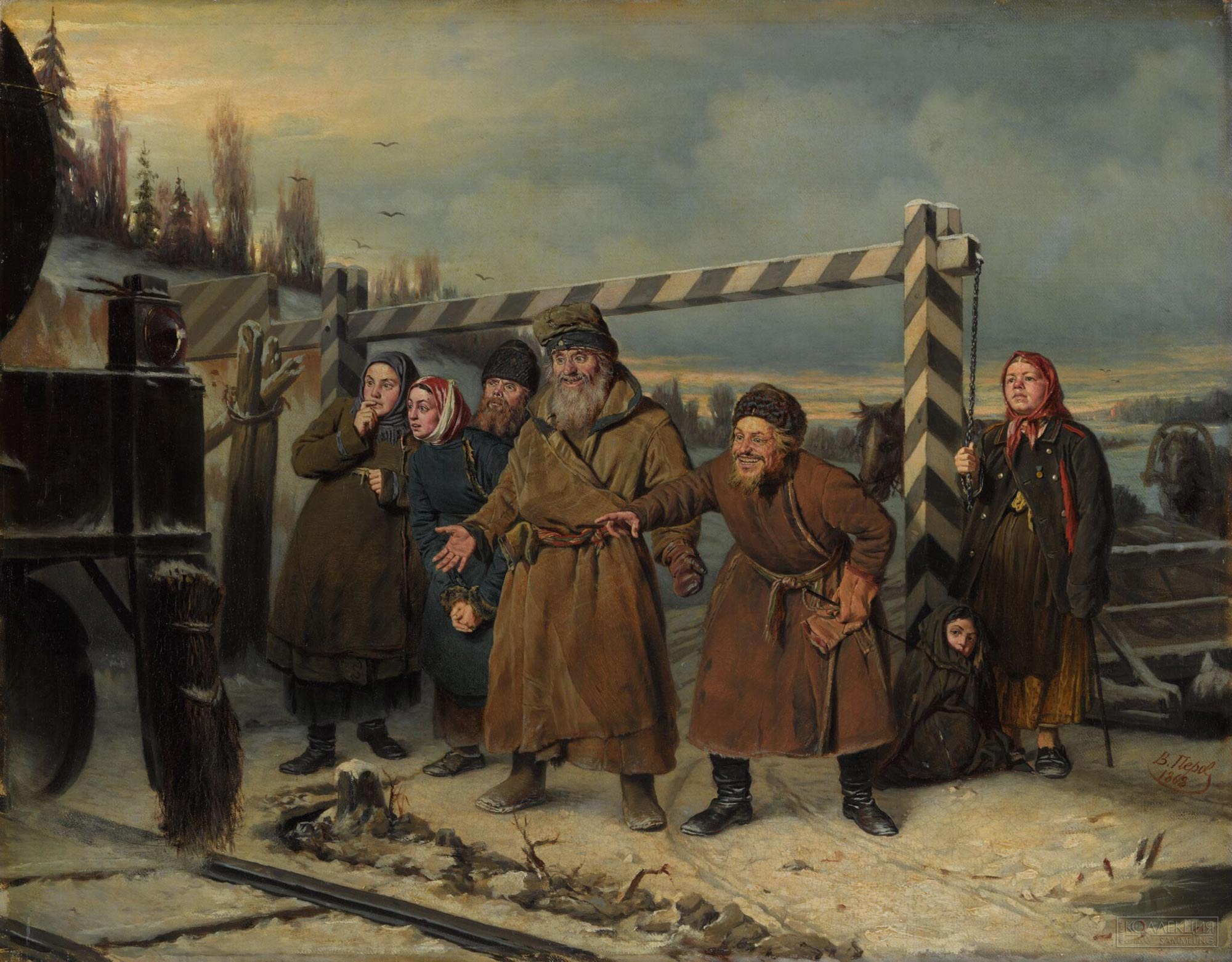
A Scene at the Railroad (1868)

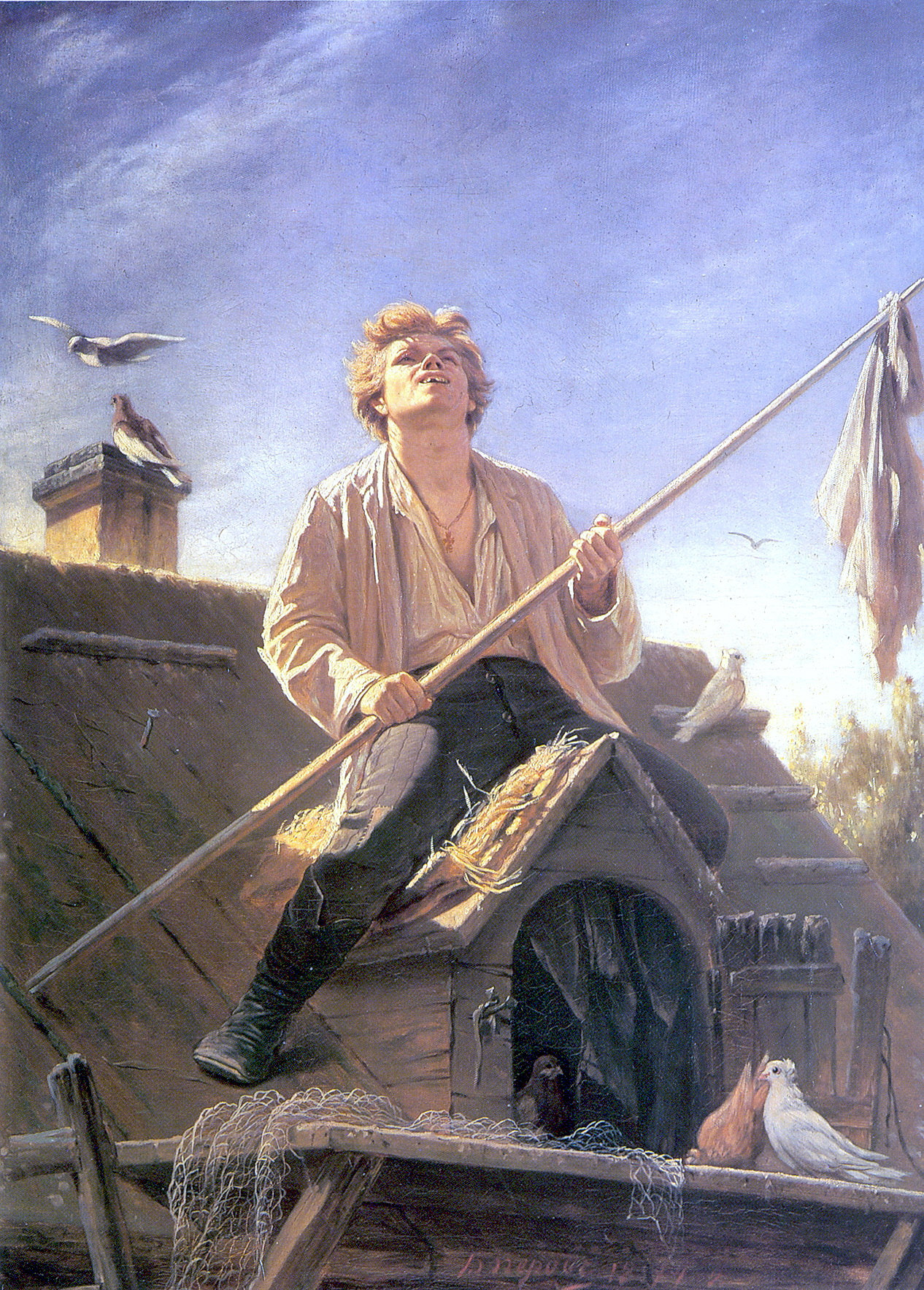
The Bird-Catcher (1870)

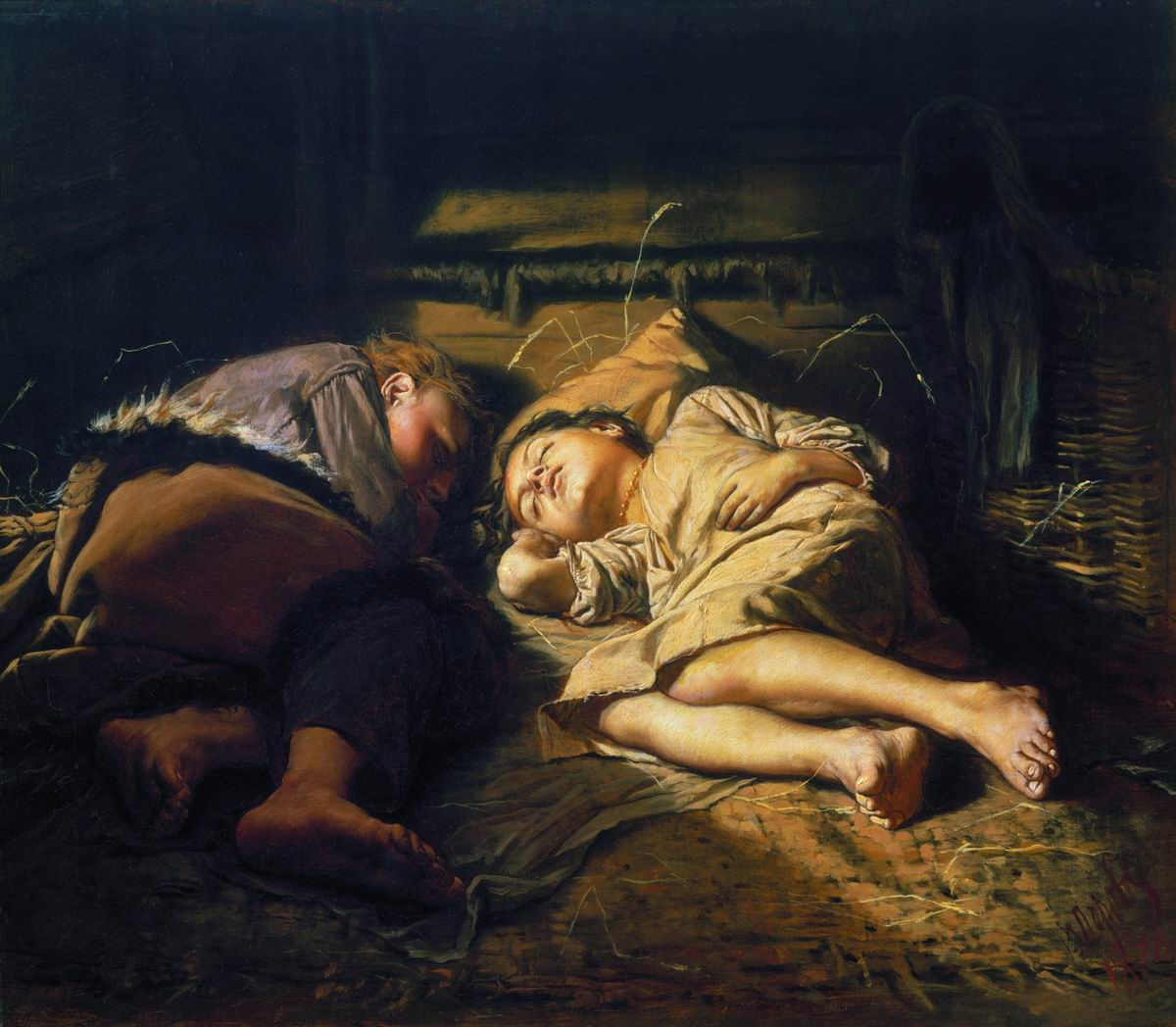
Sleeping Children (1870)

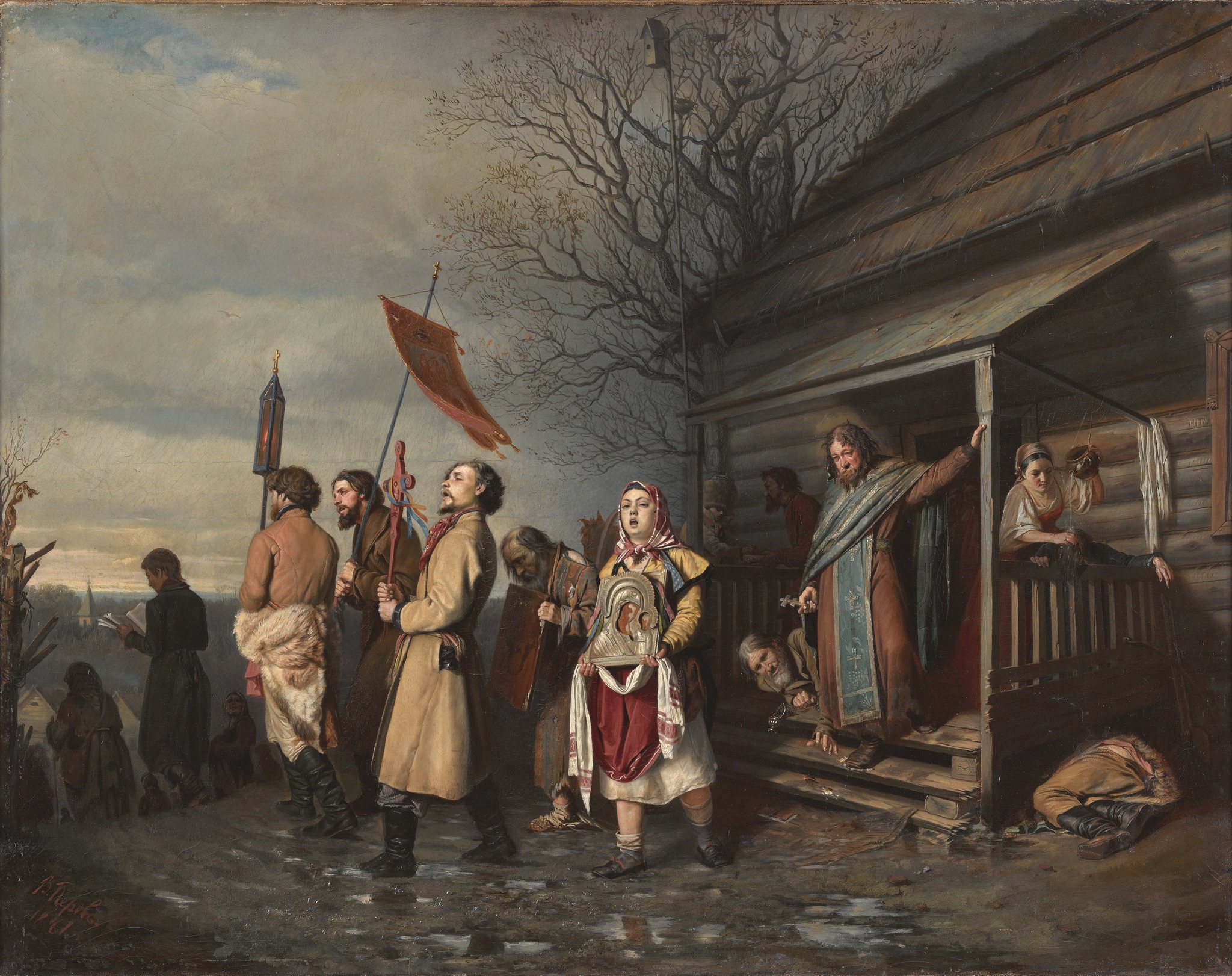
Easter Procession

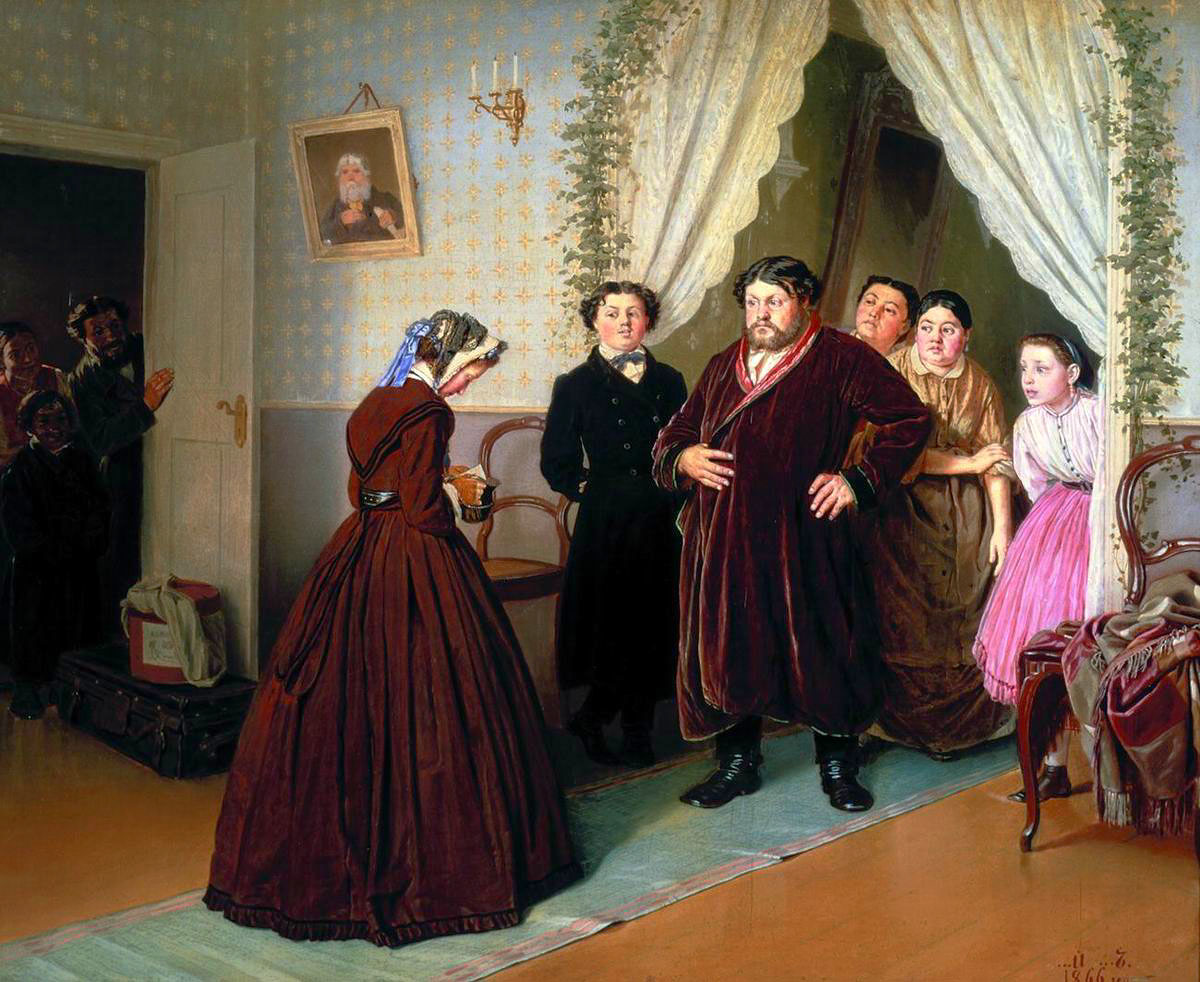
A Governess Arriving at a Merchant's House

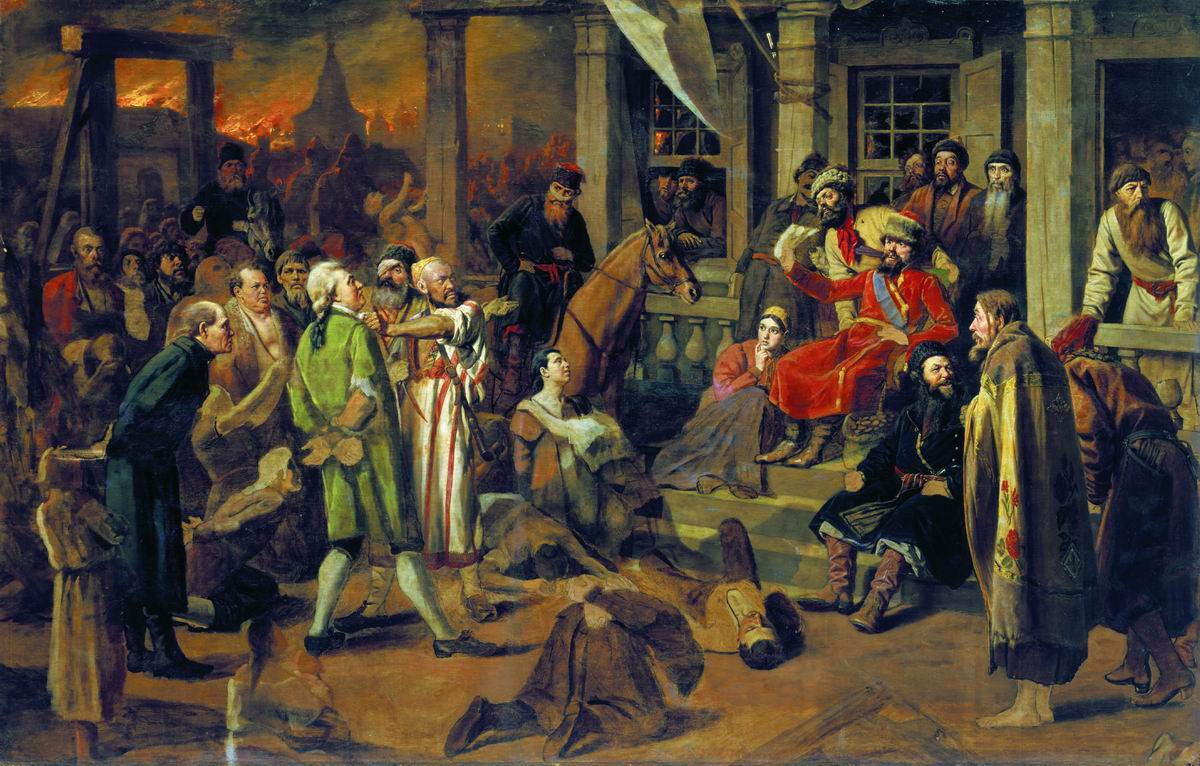
Pugachev's Judgement (1879)

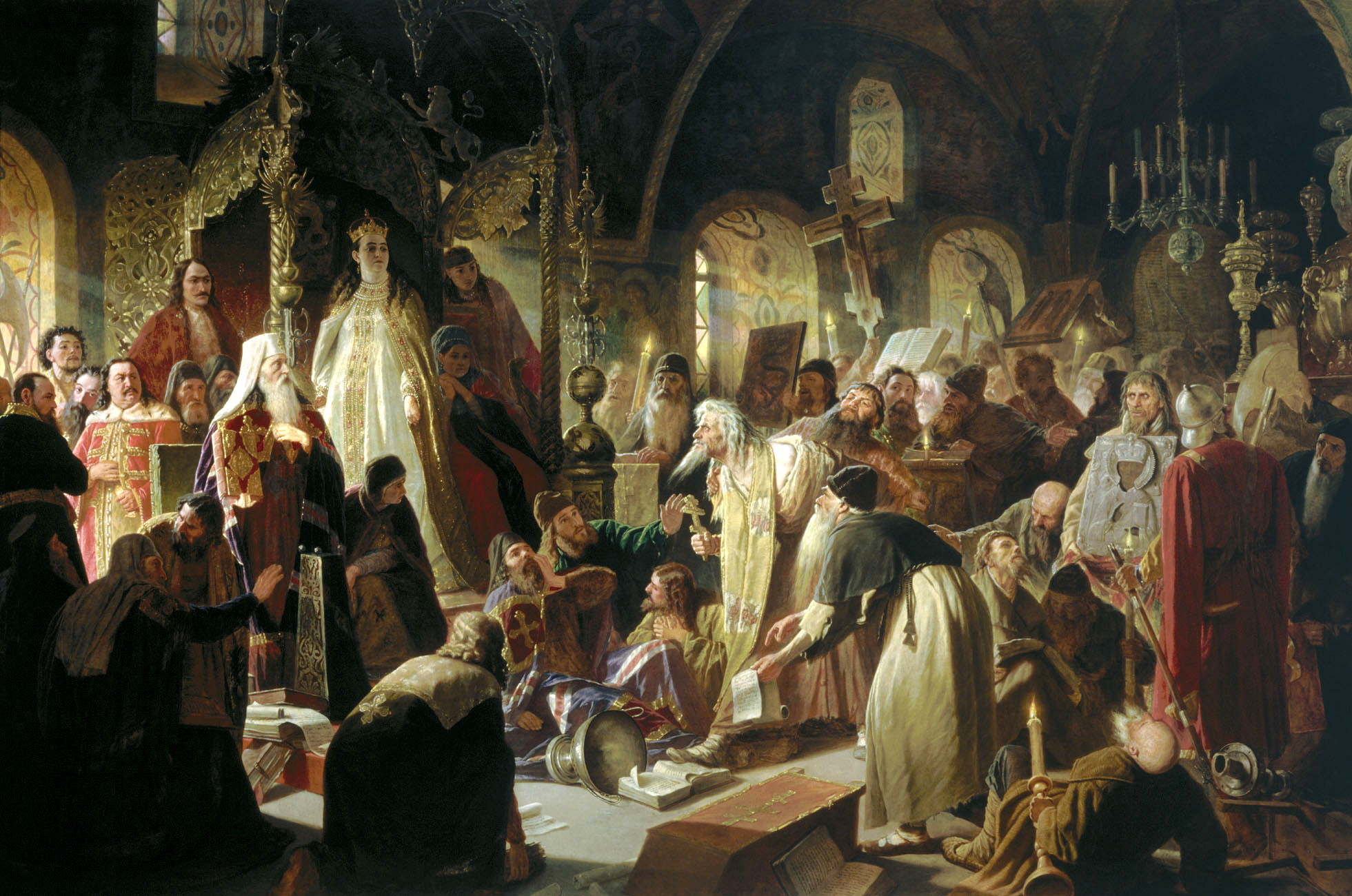
Nikita Pustosvyat. Debate about faith (1881)

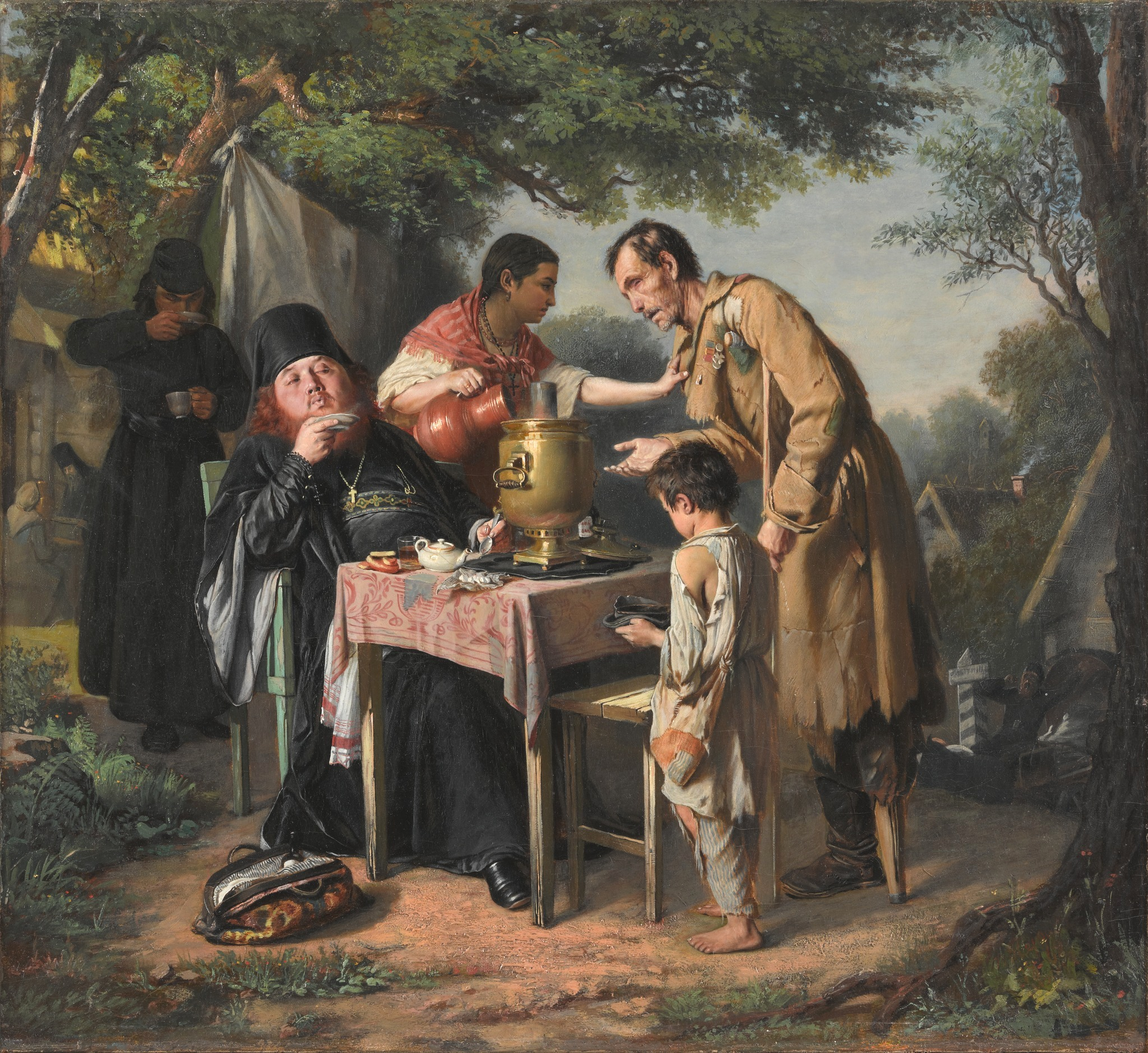
Drinking tea in Mytishchi, near Moscow.

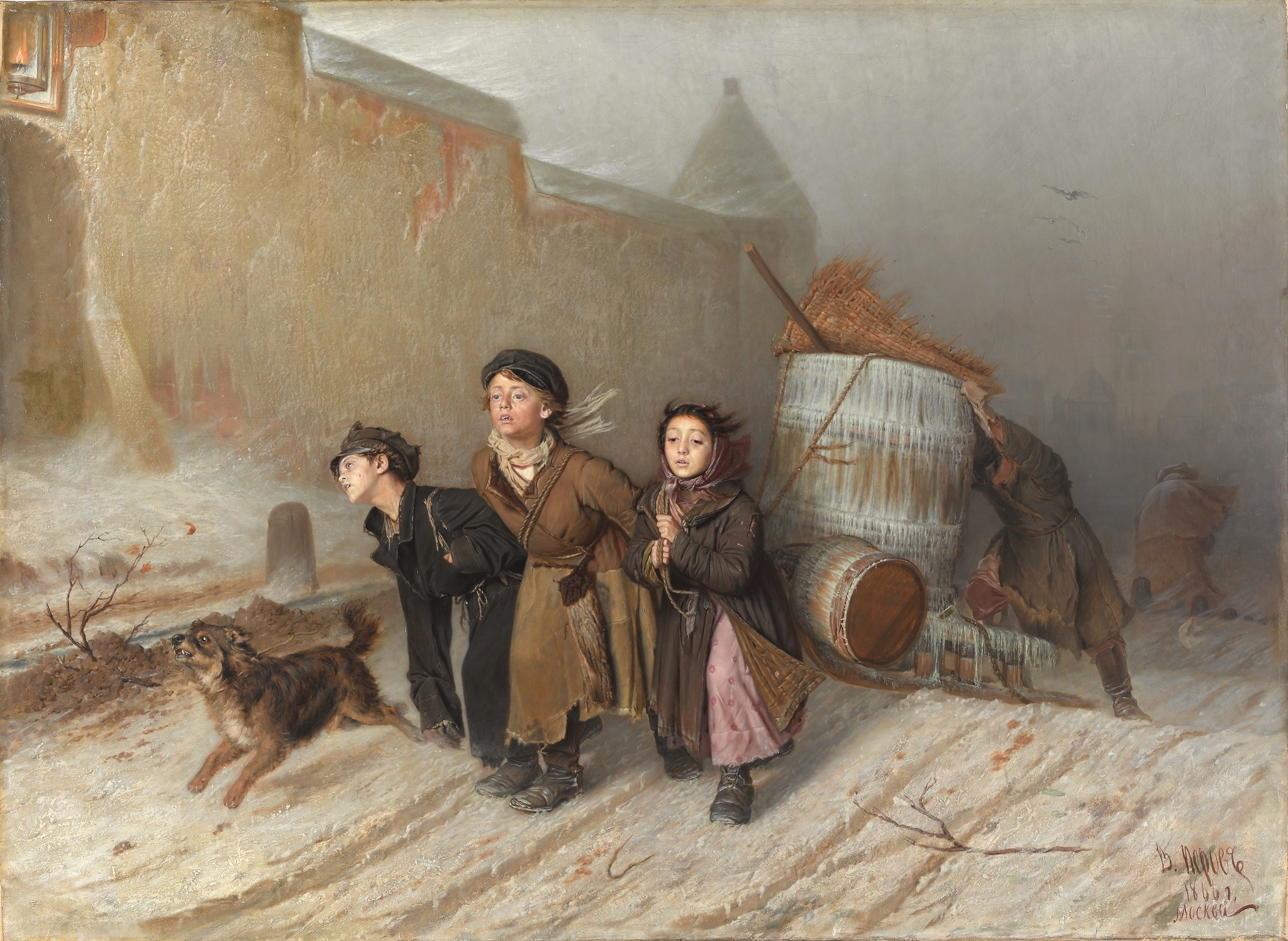
Troika

== Publications ==
- Perov, Vasily G. (1960). Leonov, Alexei I. (ed.). Рассказы художника (in Russian). Moscow: Academy of Sciences of the Soviet Union. OCLC 7266984.
