= Perov =

Perov (Russian: Перов, from перо meaning feather or nib) is a Russian masculine surname, its feminine counterpart is Perova. Notable people with the surname include:

- Aleksandr Perov (cyclist) (born 1955), Soviet cyclist
- Aleksandr Perov (footballer) (born 1978), Russian professional football coach and a former player
- Aleksandra Perova (born 1982), Russian slalom canoer
- Anatoly Perov (1926–2001), a Soviet boxer
- Andrei Perov (born 1981), a Russian professional footballer
- Elena Perova (born 1976), Russian singer and musician
- Ivan Perov (1910—1989), Soviet submariner, Hero of the Soviet Union
- Ksenia Perova (born 1989), Russian archer
- Vasily Perov (1834–1882), a Russian painter and one of the founding members of Peredvizhniki
