= Raev =

Raev or Rayev (Bulgarian and Russian: Раев) is a surname.

- Nikolai Pavlovich Raev
- Nikolay Raev
- Raycho Raev
- Metropolitan Palladius (Rayev) (secular name Pavel Ivanovich Rayev)
- Vasily Raev

== See also ==
- Rayevsky (disambiguation)
