= Rayevsky =

Rayevsky (also Raevsky) (Russian: Раевский; masculine), Rayevskaya (Раевская; feminine), or Rayevskoye (Раевское; neuter gender) may refer to:

== People ==
- Alexander Rayevsky, several people
- Alexander Raevsky (aviator) (1887–1937), Russian aviator
- Alexander Rayevsky (1957–2008), Russian test pilot
- Maksim Rayevsky (d. 1931), Russian-Jewish anarcho-syndicalist
- Mariya Rayevskaya, maiden name of Mariya Volkonskaya
- Nikolay Raevsky (1771–1829), Russian general and statesman

== Places ==
- Rayevsky (rural locality), a rural locality (a selo) in the Republic of Bashkortostan, Russia
- Rayevskaya (rural locality), a rural locality (a stanitsa) in the Krasnodar Krai, Russia
- Rayevskoye, name of several rural localities in Russia
