= Evgraf Fedorovich Krendovsky =

Russian painter

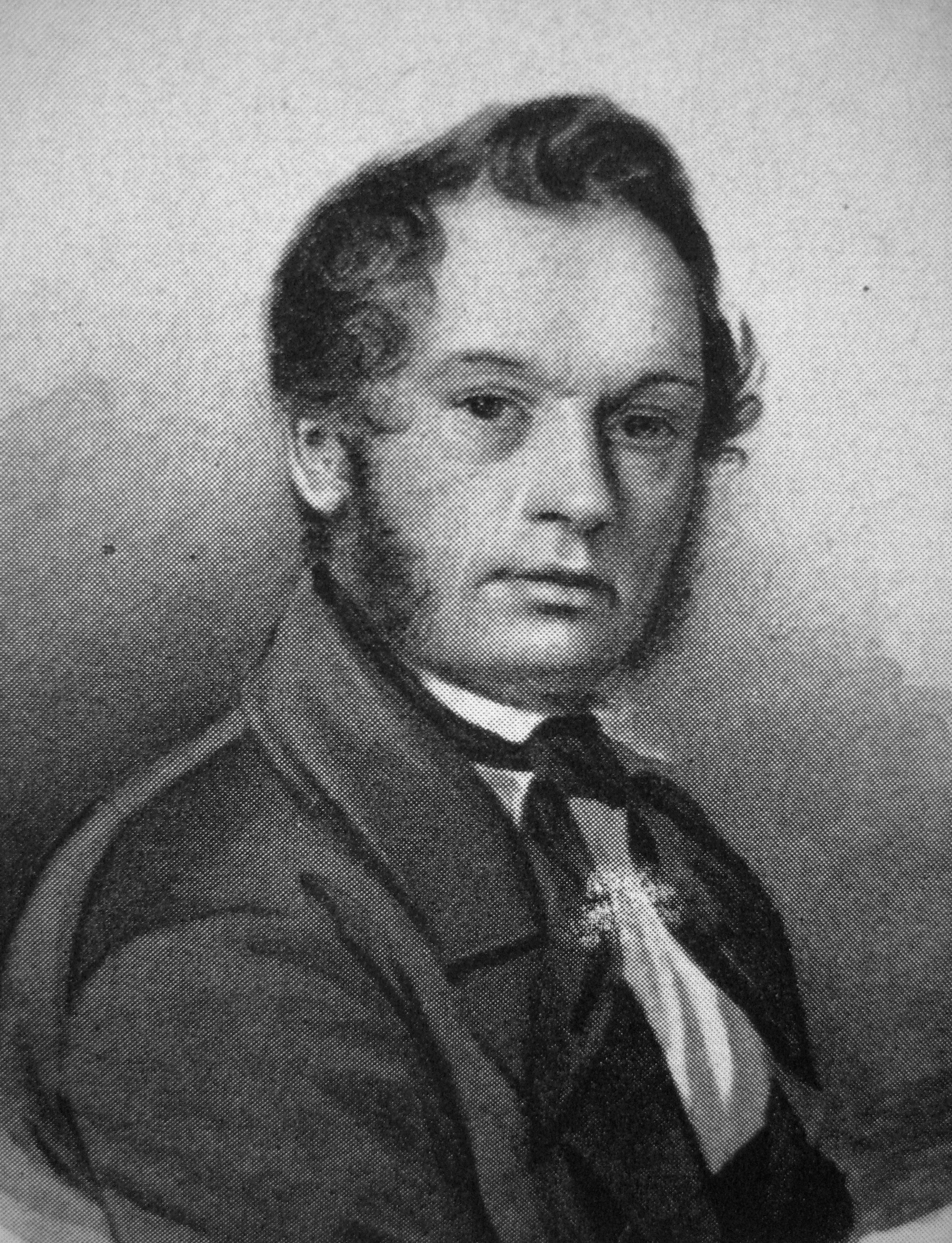
Self-portrait (1853?)

Evgraf Fedorovych Krendovsky (Ukrainian: Євграф Федорович Крендовський, 1810, Kremenchuk, Poltava Governorate, Russian Empire, now Ukraine — 1870s, unknown) was a Russian portrait, genre and interior portrait painter.

== Biography ==
Yevgraf Fedorovych Krendovskyi was born in Kremenchuk, Poltava province in Ukraine in 1810 in the family of an officer. His father was apparently a constable of some sort so, as a young man, he worked at the police station in Arzamas, where he also attended the famous art school operated by Alexander Stupin. From 1830 to 1835, he lived in Saint Petersburg and studied with Alexey Venetsianov. At that time, he is known to have presented an exhibition at the Imperial Academy of Arts.

In 1835, family issues forced him to return to Kremenchuk, where he became the drawing tutor for a local landowner's family in nearby Poltava Province, now Ukraine. Four years later, on the basis of two paintings sent to the Academy, he was awarded the title of "Free Artist". Despite being relatively isolated in the provinces, some of his best-known works were created during the 1840s, some of which are now in the Tretyakov Gallery. Closer to 1860, Krendovsky and his family moved to Kremenchuk, where he opened a private art school. In 1861, he painted an iconostasis for the home church of the Poltava Boys' Gymnasium (destroyed in the 20s of the 20th century).

Slightly more than twenty paintings constitute his entire known output. His last extant work is dated 1853, and he may have operated a private art school in the 1860s. His fate after that point is unknown, although it is generally believed that he lived at his brother's estate near Arzamas and died sometime during the 1870s. According to modern research, it is believed that the artist spent his last years in the village of Manuylivka (now Verkhnya Manuylivka, Kozelshchyna District, Poltava Region, Ukraine), where he was buried together with his wife in the family crypt (probably in the 1870s).

== Selected paintings ==
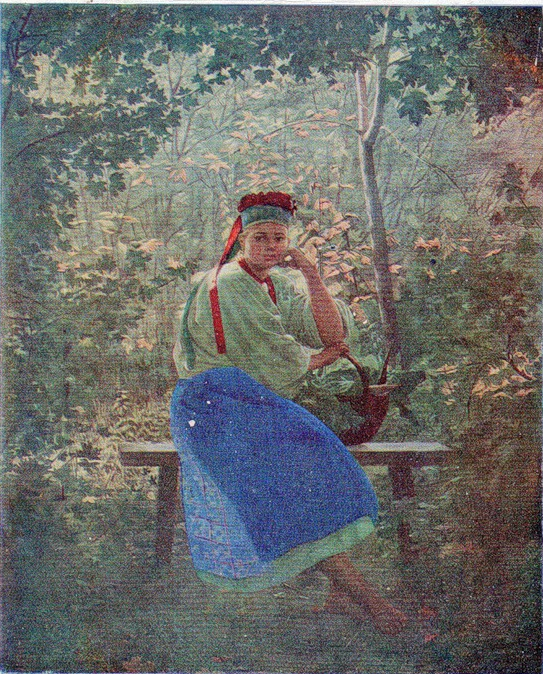
Ukrainian Woman
(date unknown)

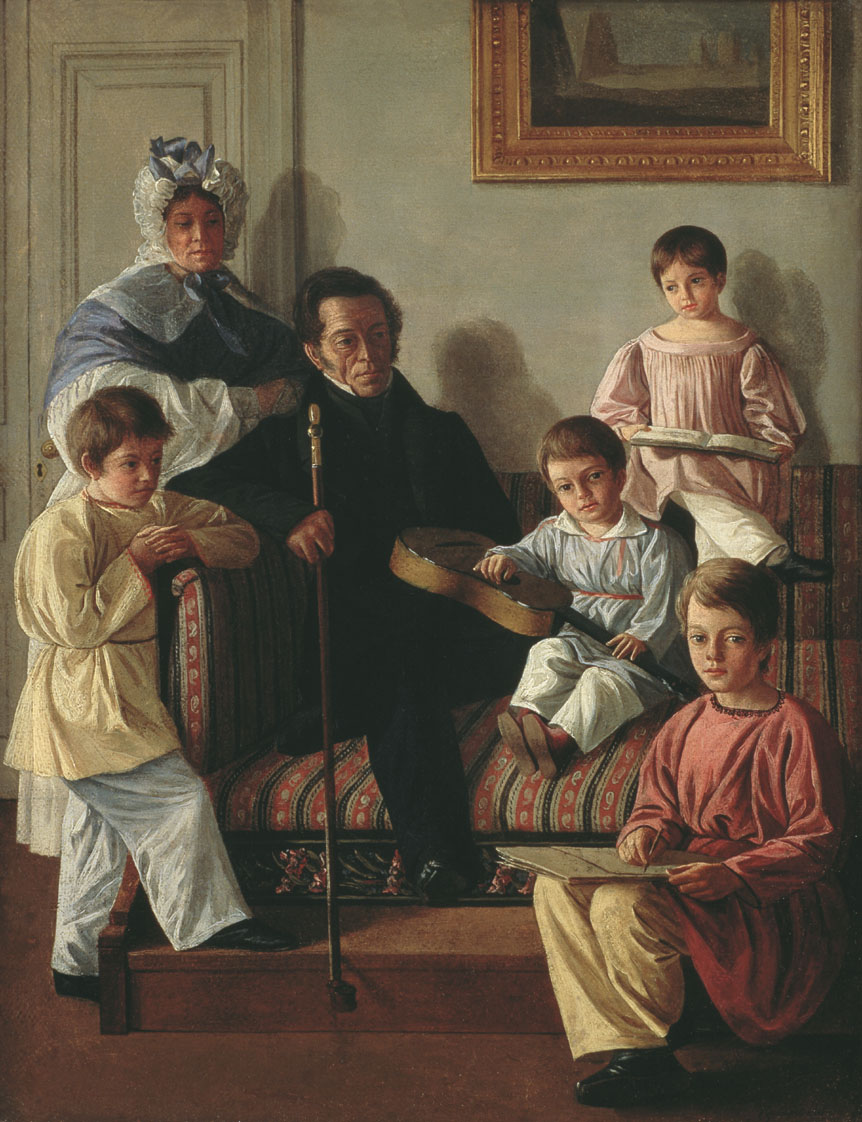
Alexander Bashilov with His Family (1830)

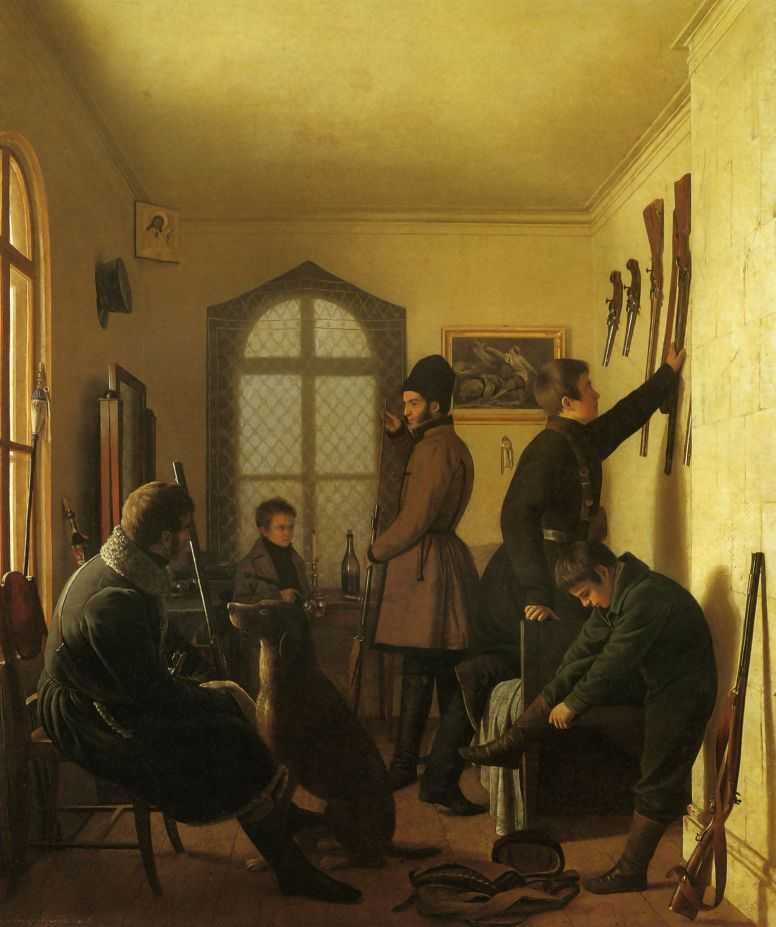
To the Hunt (1836)

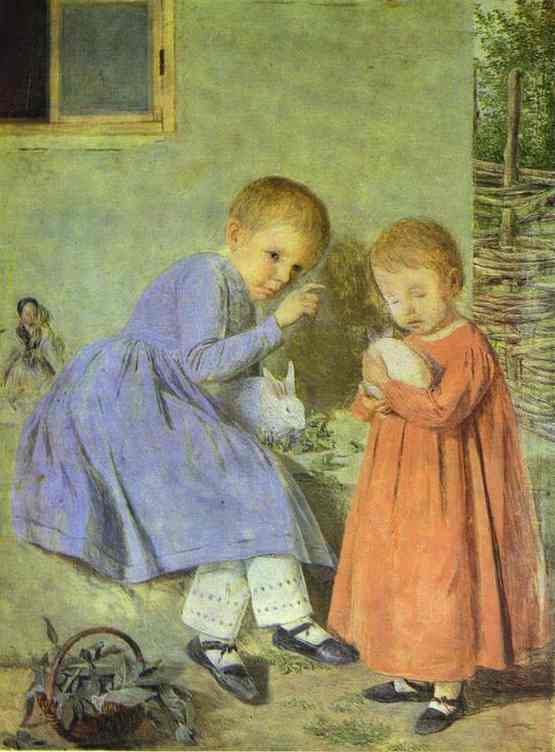
The Artist's Daughters (1845)
