= Alexander Rayevsky =

Aleksandr Rayevskiy may refer to:

- Alexander Raevsky (aviator) (1887—1937), Russian aviator
- Aleksander Rayevsky (1957–2008), Russian test pilot
- Alyaksandr Rayewski (born 1988), Belarusian footballer
