= Arzamas I railway station =

Railway station in Arzamas, Nizhny Novgorod, Russia

Arzamas I Арзамас I
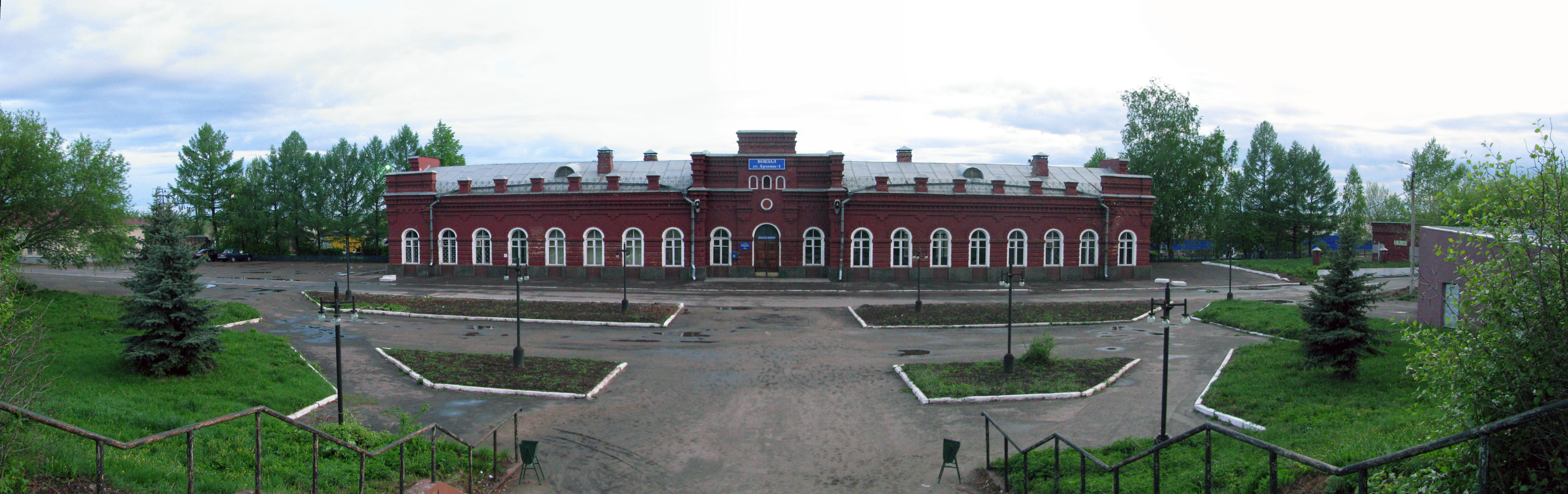
- View of the station

General information
- Location: 3, Stantsionnaya Str, Arzamas, Nizhny Novgorod Oblast Russia
- Coordinates: 55.406111°N 43.792222°E
- Platforms: 2
- Tracks: 9

Construction
- Parking: yes

Other information
- Station code: 245605

History
- Opened: 1901
Location

Arzamas I railway station (Russian: станция Арзамас I) is a major mainline railway station located in Arzamas, Nizhny Novgorod Oblast, Russia. It is a junction of Gorky Railway, 115 km from Nizhny Novgorod railway station. The station combines four routes out of Arzamas. It is an important junction, where the Nizhny Novgorod — Arzamas main line, and the railway lines to Kanash, Saransk and Murom diverge. It is approximately 2,4 km from the town center.

== History ==
Arzamas I station was opened in 1901 with the construction of Nizhny Novgorod — Arzamas railway. Construction began in April 1900. The work on the Arzamas — Romodanovo section was coordinated by engineer G. Buganov, but that target dates for opening railway to traffic had been repeatedly missed. The construction was slow. The opening of traffic from Nizhny Novgorod to Arzamas took place at the end of December 1901. However speed of passenger and freight trains was limited to 10 versts per hour (about 11 km/h).

In 1902 the society of the Moscow-Kazan Railway presented a project of a line from Lyubertsy to Shikhrany (now Kanash) via Murom, Arzamas and Sergach with a length of 602 versts (641 km). Construction of a bridge across the Volga River was required upon the project. In 1903 the road project was finally approved, but with the beginning of the Russo-Japanese War the construction was suspended. Only in April 1910 the construction of the first road section began. The engineer A. Frolovskiy supervised the construction. The bridge across the Volga River near Kazan was designed by the famous bridge builder Professor N. Belelyubsky. The first section from Lyubertsy to Murom was opened in December 1911- The first train from Lyubertsy to Arzamas arrived on 15 October 1912.

Emperor Nicholas II of Russia was visiting railway station. The Emperor arrived accompanied by his family to pilgrimage to the Sarov Monastery. In 1918 the Arzamas-Kanash line put into operation, providing the shortest connection between Moscow and Kazan.

Arzamas I railway station was the scene of the Arzamas train disaster, one of the worst accidents on the Soviet railways. The disaster took place on June 4, 1988, while a freight train featuring three goods wagons carrying 118 tons of explosives exploded at a railway crossing near the Arzamas-1 train station when hexogen included in the load detonated. 91 persons were killed, 151 buildings were destroyed.

Regulation of the Nizhny Novgorod Oblast Government No. 179 of 3 September 1996 the station building is nominated to the register of objects of cultural heritage of the Russian Federation.

== Services ==
The station is operated by Russian Railways. Arzamas is the terminal for long-distance and suburban trains operated by the Federal Passenger Company and Volga-Vyatka Suburban Passenger Company. The most common destinations are: Kirov, Adler, Anapa, Samara, Saint Petersburg, Ufa, Moscow, Vorkuta. The average stopping times of passenger trains are of about 2 minutes. The station hosts suburban trains only from Nizhny Novgorod. Electric trains ED9A make a passenger trips from Arzamas I station.

== Gallery ==
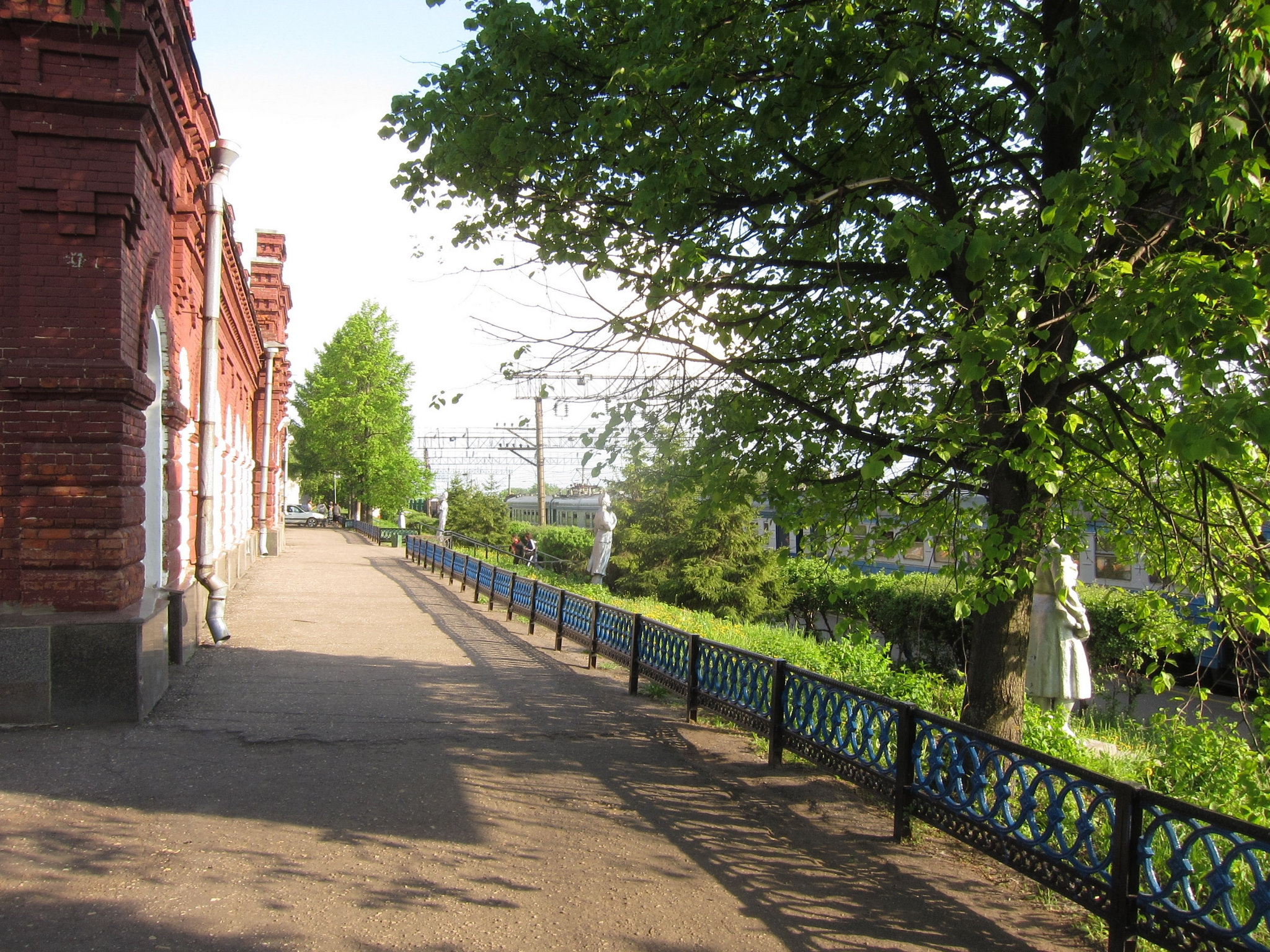
View from the platform

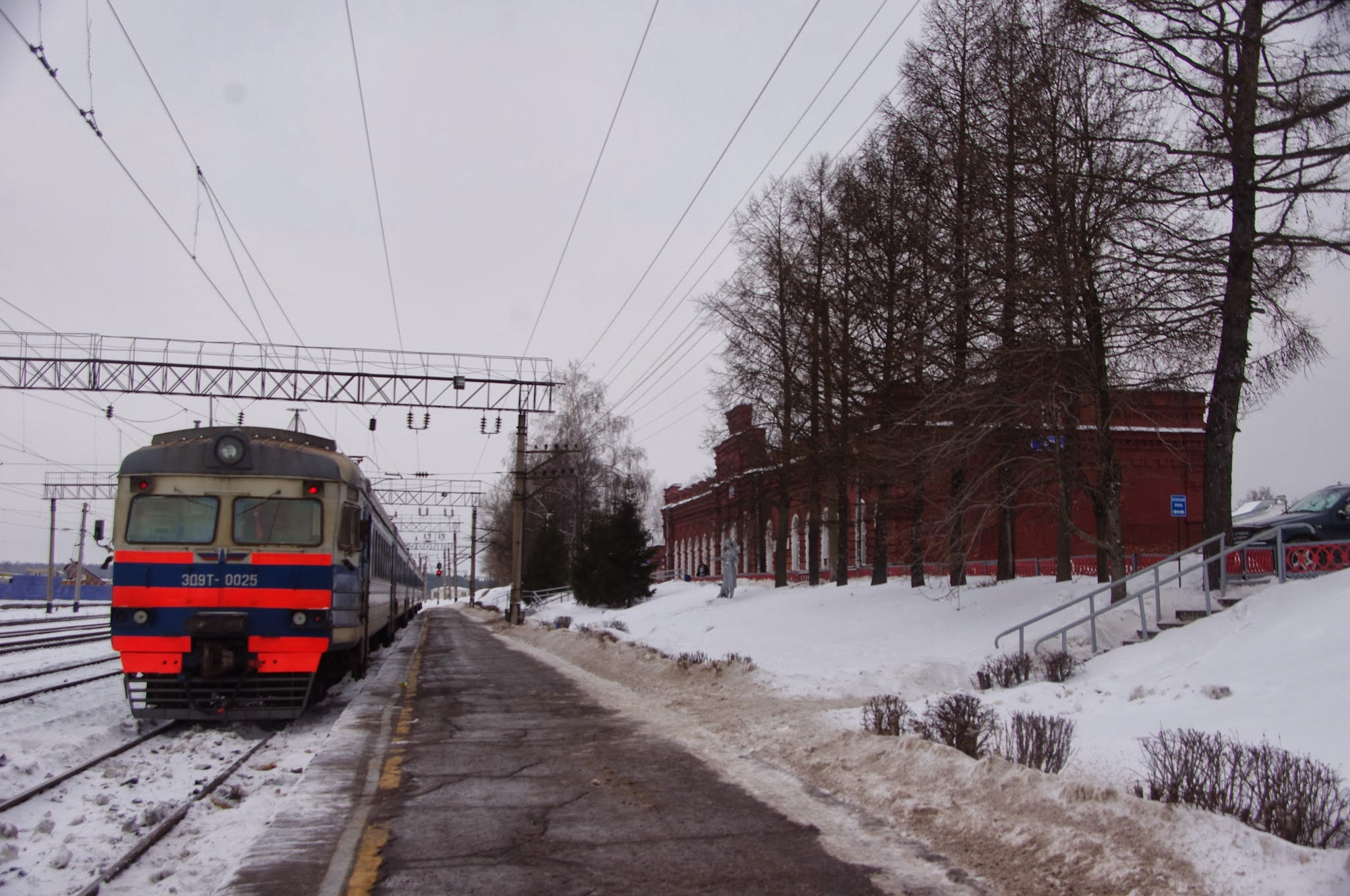
ED9T suburban electric train

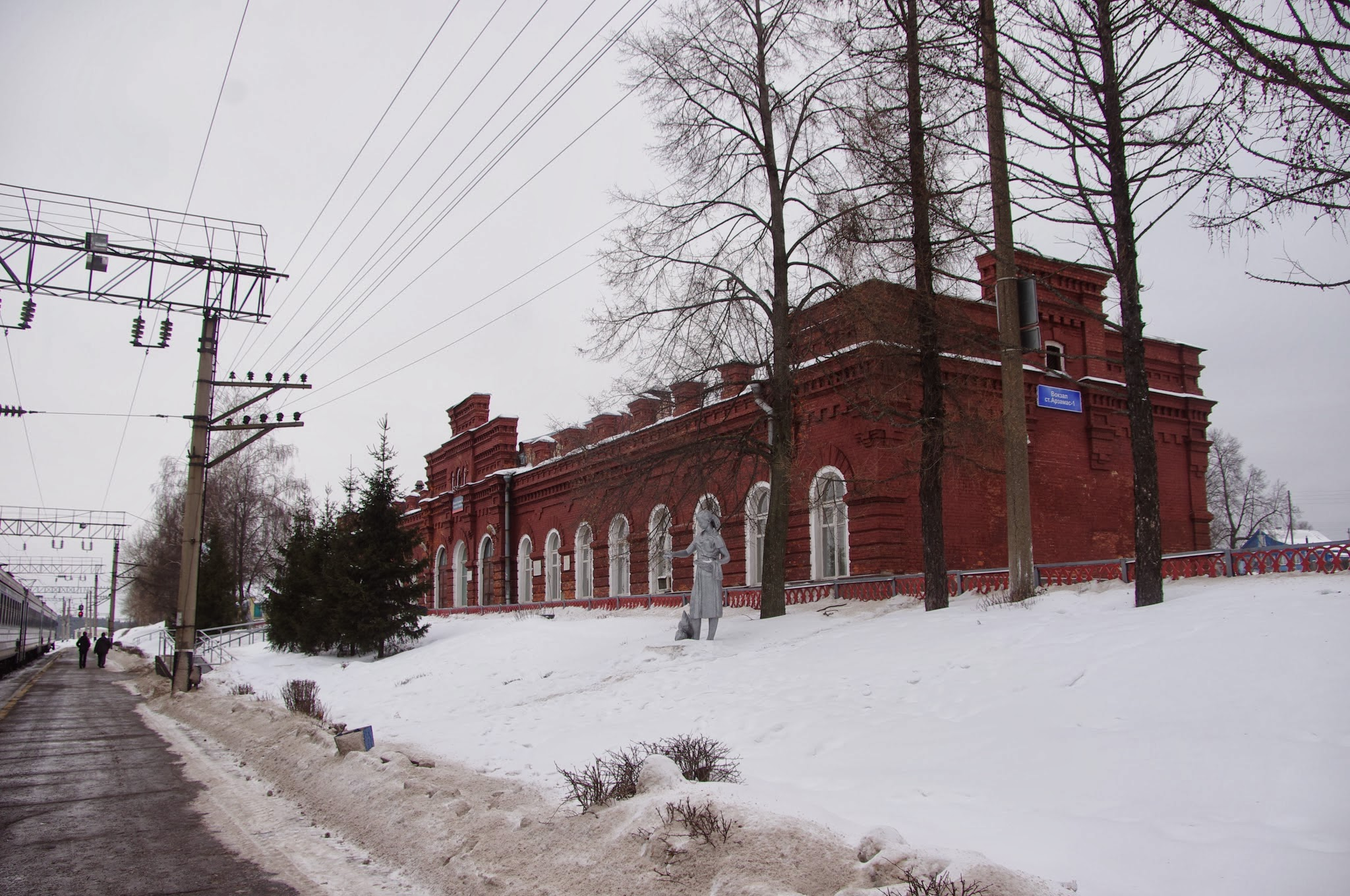

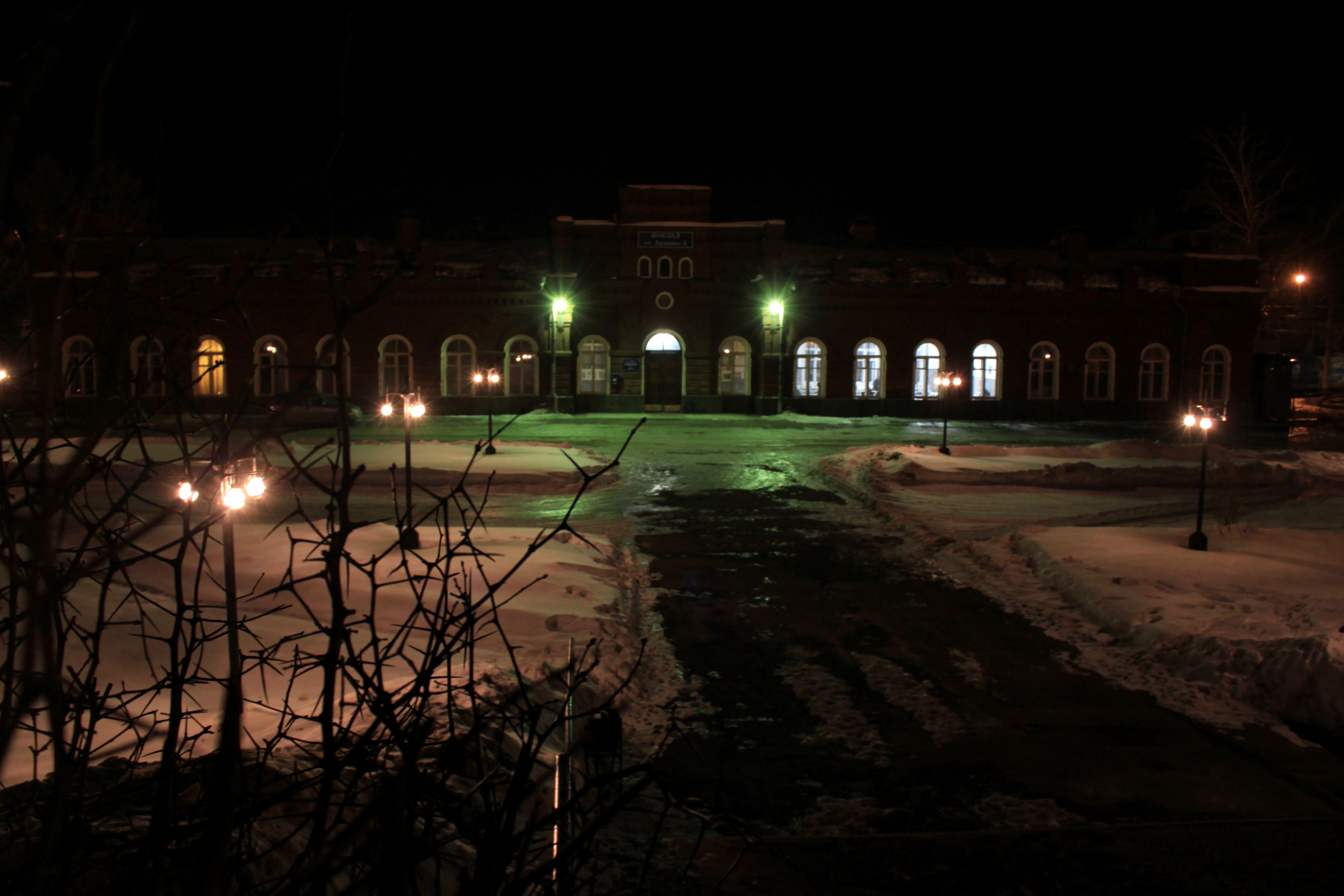

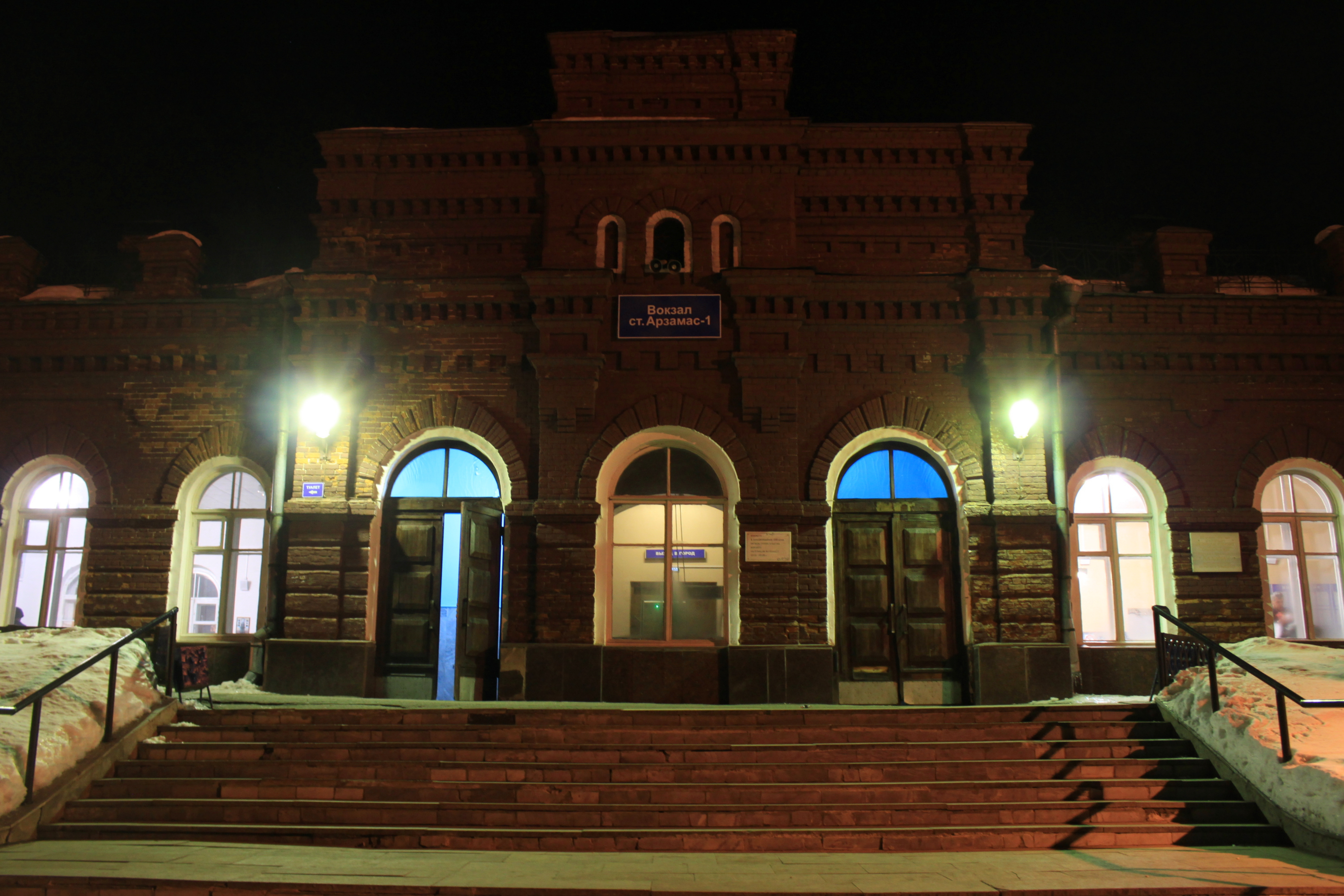
