= Vasily Raev =

Russian painter

- Василий Егорович Раев
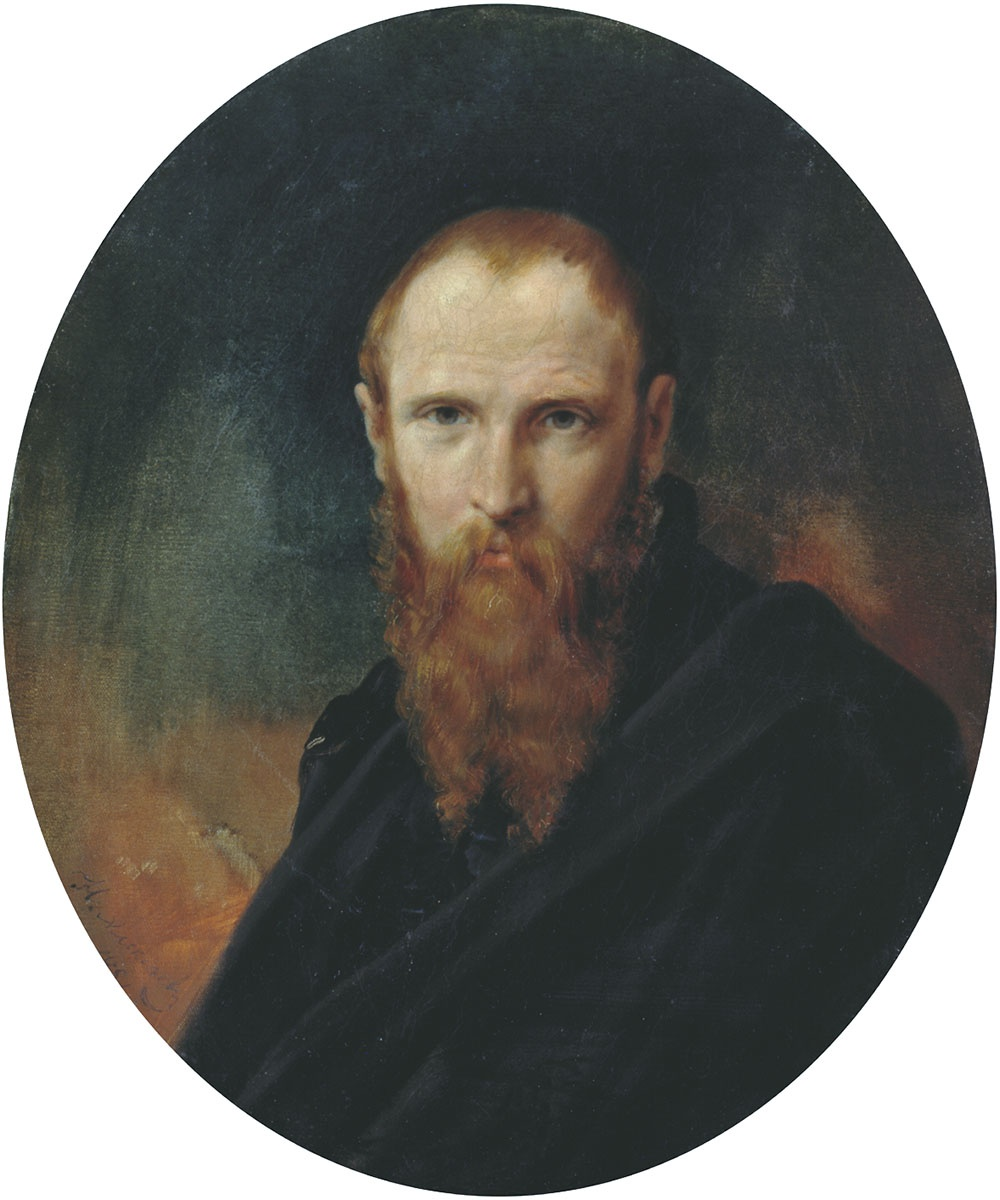
- Portrait by Nikolay Alekseyev-Syromyansky, 1851, oils; Art Museum, Nizhny Novgorod
- Born: 1808; Kholmsky Uyezd, Pskov Governorate, Russian Empire
- Died: March 29, 1871 (aged 62–63); Moscow
- Education: Imperial Academy of Arts (1840)
- Known for: Painting

Vasily Egorovich Raev (Russian: Васи́лий Его́рович Ра́ев; 1808–1871) was a Russian painter and member of the Imperial Academy of Arts.

== Biography ==
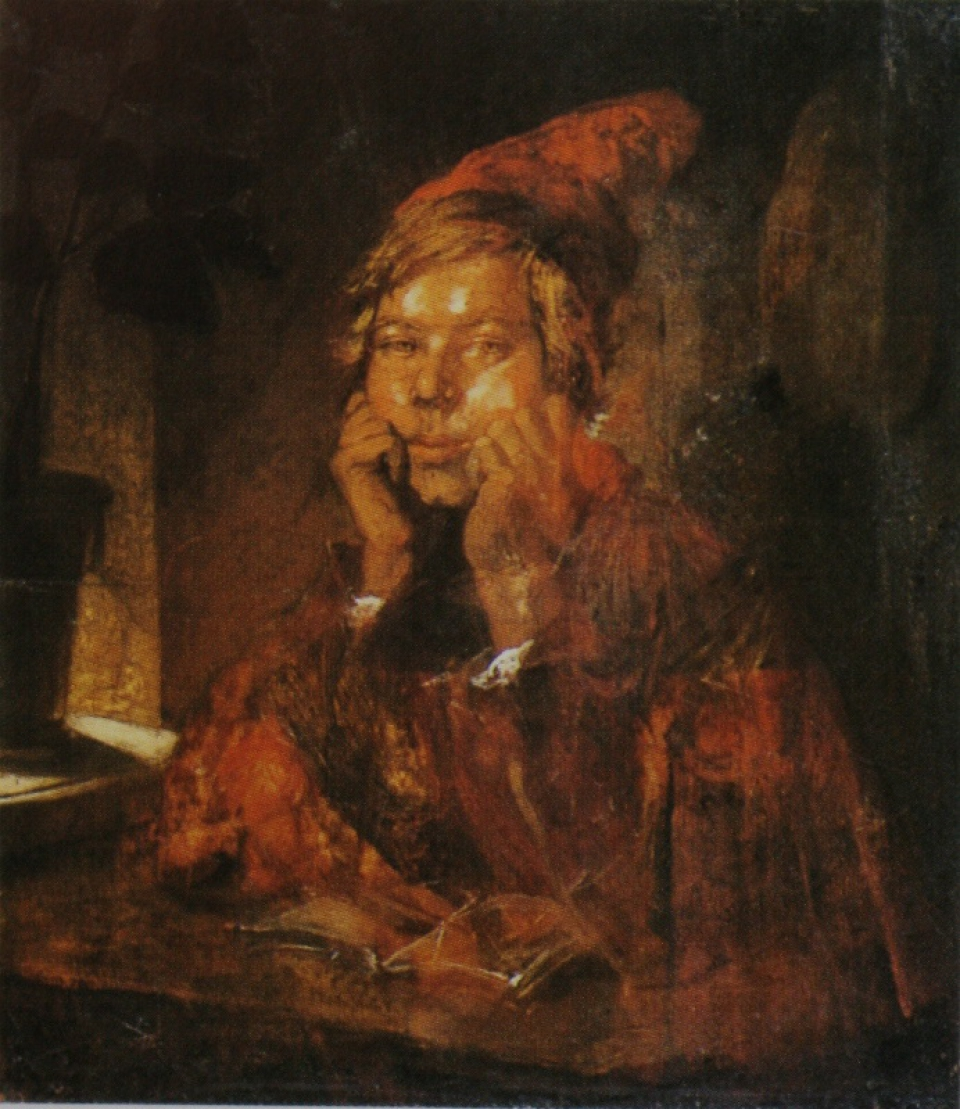
Self portrait (1830)

He was originally a serf, belonging to a Mr.Kushelev, who later gave him his freedom. He received his initial training at a private painting school in Arzamas, operated by Alexander Stupin. He continued his studies at the Imperial Academy of Arts in St. Petersburg, with Mikhail Matveevich Ivanov.

In 1837, he made a trip to the Caucasus, bringing back numerous sketches of the Ural and Altai mountains. In 1840, the Academy awarded him the title of "Artist" (no-class). In 1842, he was sent abroad as a pensioner of the Academy. While in Rome, in addition to painting, he studied mosaics. In 1849, he was forced to return to Russia, due to continuing political unrest in Italy.

For two years, he worked on creating mosaics. He was recognized as an Academician in 1851. He went abroad again in 1854. In the last years of his life he was engaged in painting in the Byzantine Style.

He was also a sought-after teacher. His students included Ivan Aivazovsky and Alexey Bogolyubov.

Among his best known works are a view of Rome from Monte Mario and the "Vision of Alypius". His works may be seen at the Tretyakov Gallery, the Russian Museum, and the Tropinin Museum.

== Selected paintings ==
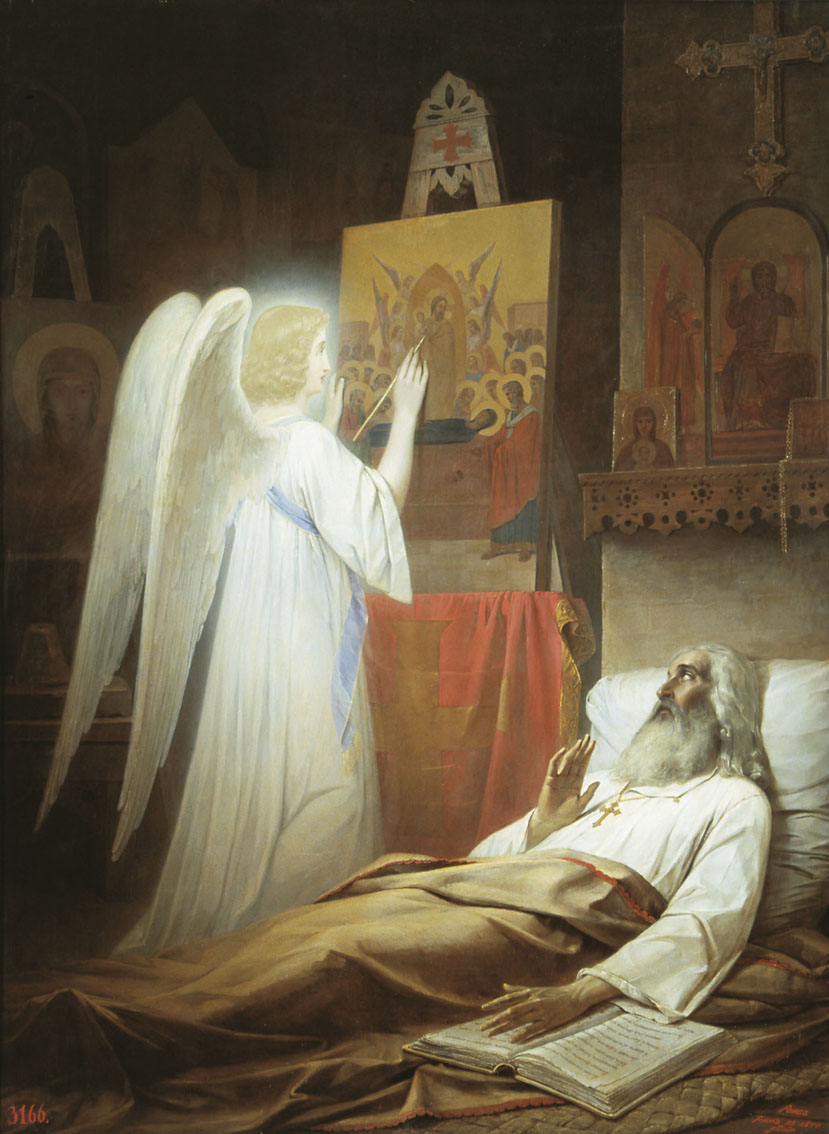
The Vision of Alypius

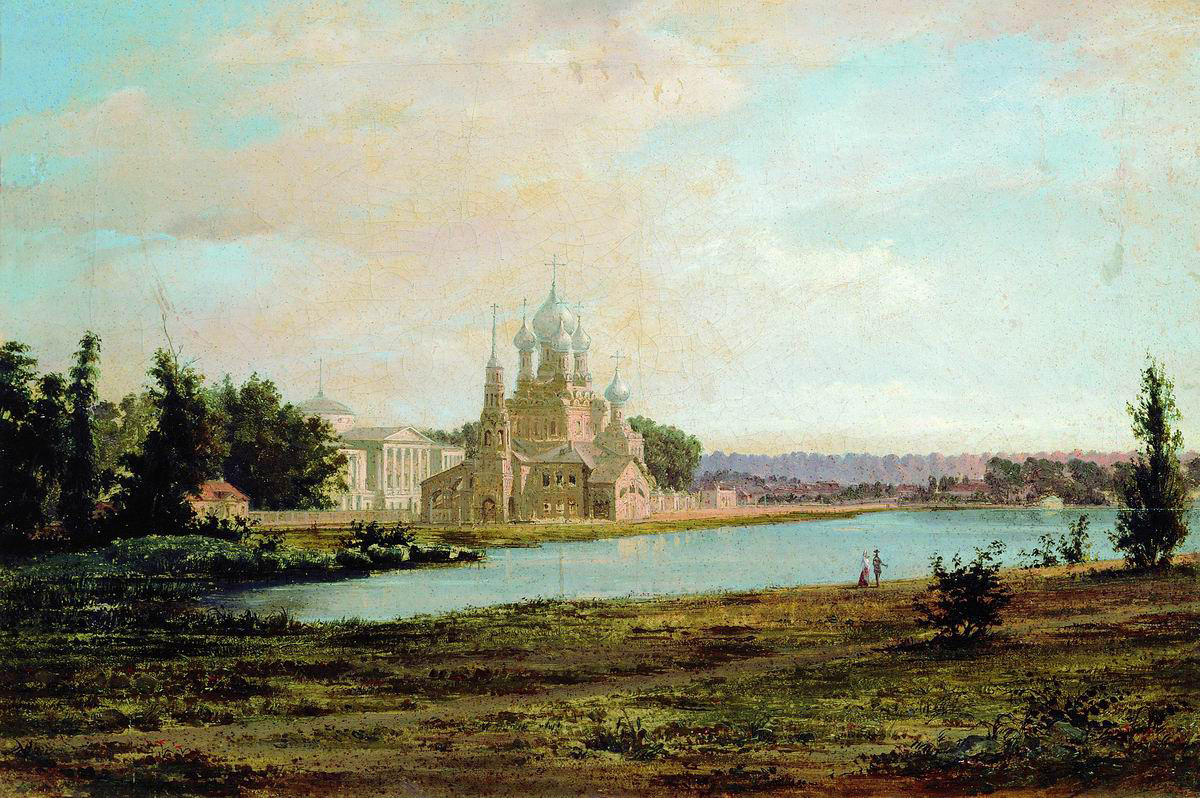
View of the Church at Sheremetev Palace

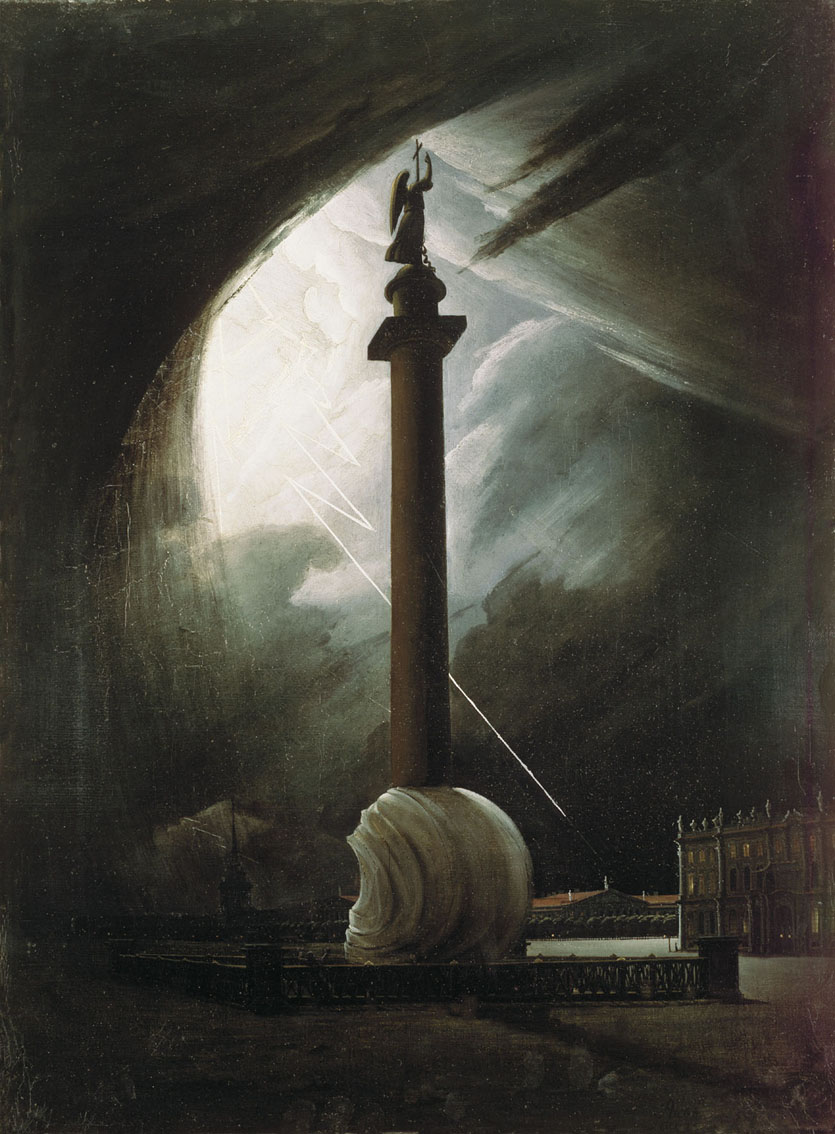
Alexander Column in a Thunderstorm

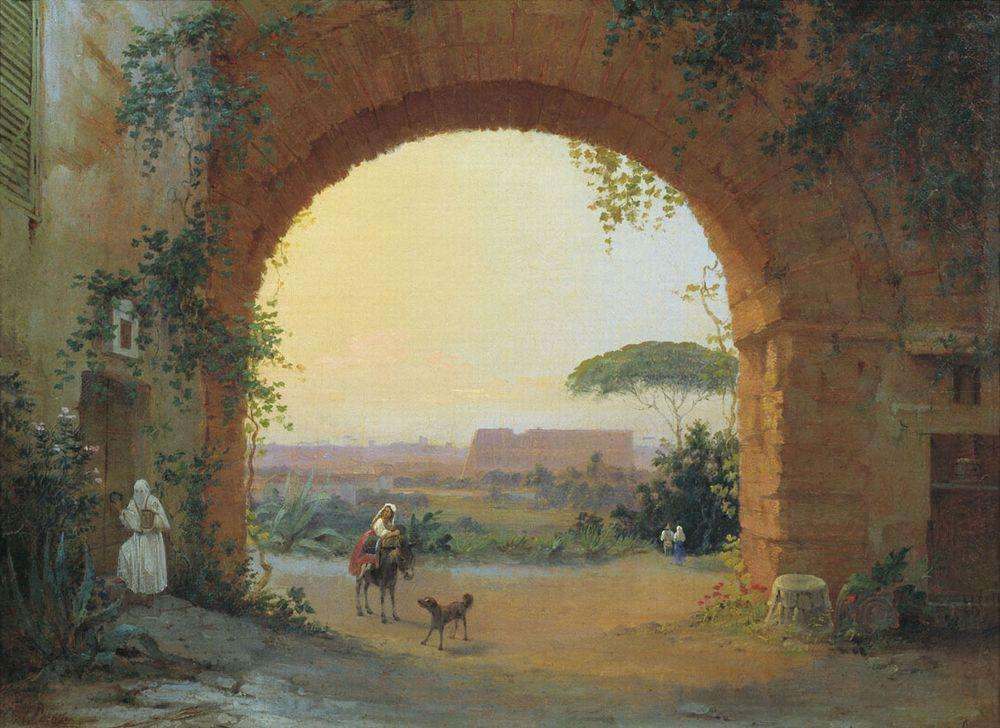
Italian Landscape Near Rome

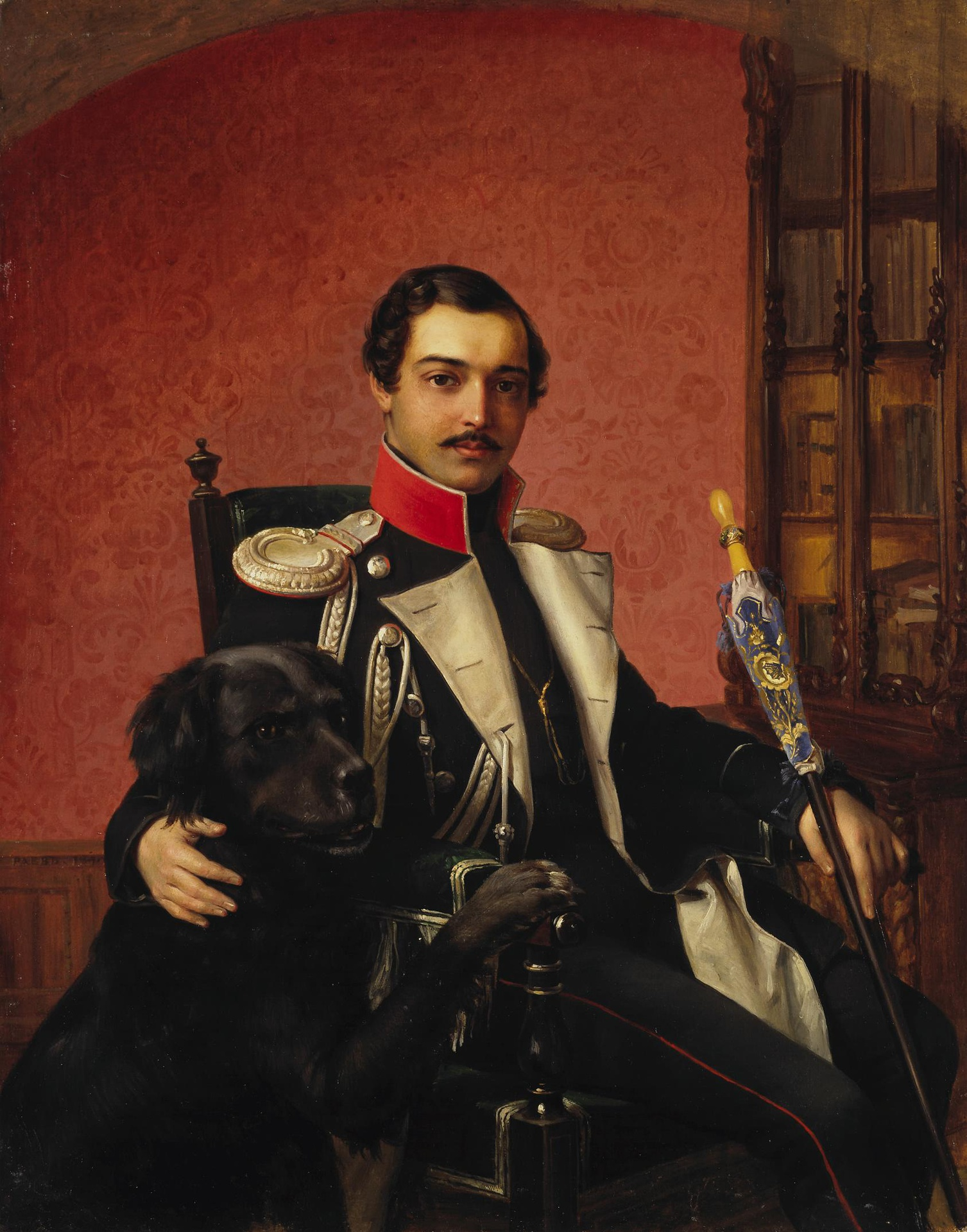
Portrait of Ivan Alexandrovich Balashov

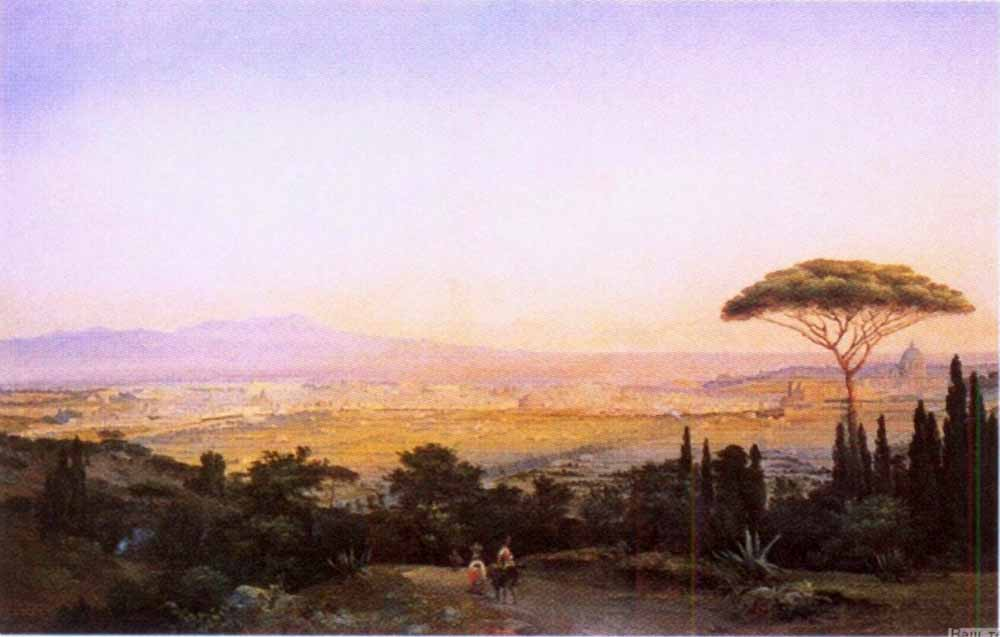
View of Rome from Monte Mario

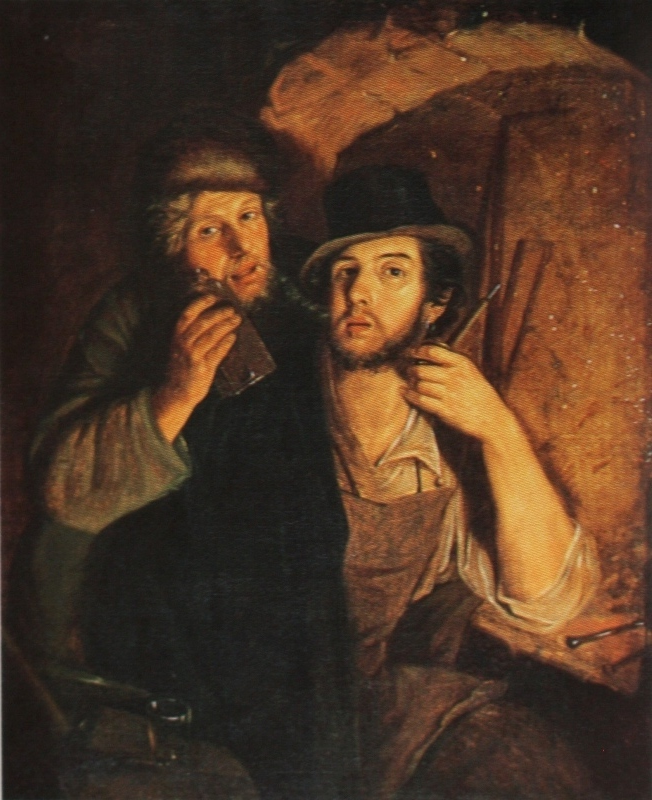
Workers for the Demidov Family
