= Marina Orlova (YouTuber) =

Russian philologist and broadcaster (born 1980)

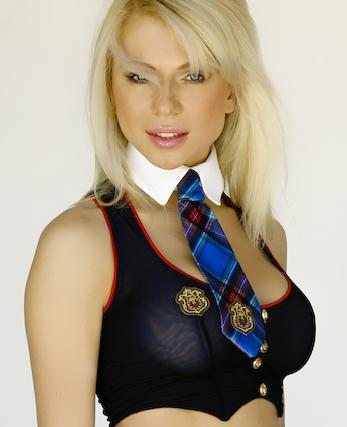
- Born: Marina Vladimirovna Rodina; 10 December 1980 (age 45); Arzamas, Russian SFSR, Soviet Union
- Years active: 2007–present
- Known for: Infotainment etymology
- Website: https://marinaorlova.com/

Marina Vladimirovna Orlova (Russian: Марина Владимировна Орлова, born 10 December 1980) is a Russian host of a popular YouTube channel, HotForWords, and a corresponding website. In 2012 she started an online series of videos for a personal finance website Bankrate.com where she explains the meaning of commonly used financial and economic terms.

== Early life and education ==
Orlova was born in Arzamas (Nizhny Novgorod Oblast) Russian SFSR, Soviet Union in 1980. She worked at a shop for a year before applying to an international recruitment program. She wanted to do something creative, or improve her English skills and to prepare for her Ph.D; she was then sent to a small town near San Francisco and worked as a nanny for a working family with two children. A year later she moved to Hollywood, where she attempted to start a career in modelling. After going to two photoshoots, she was told that at 5 feet 5 inches (1.65 m), she was too short.

She has two degrees in philology and taught English and world literature to high school students in Moscow before moving to the United States to pursue further education.

== Hot for Words website ==
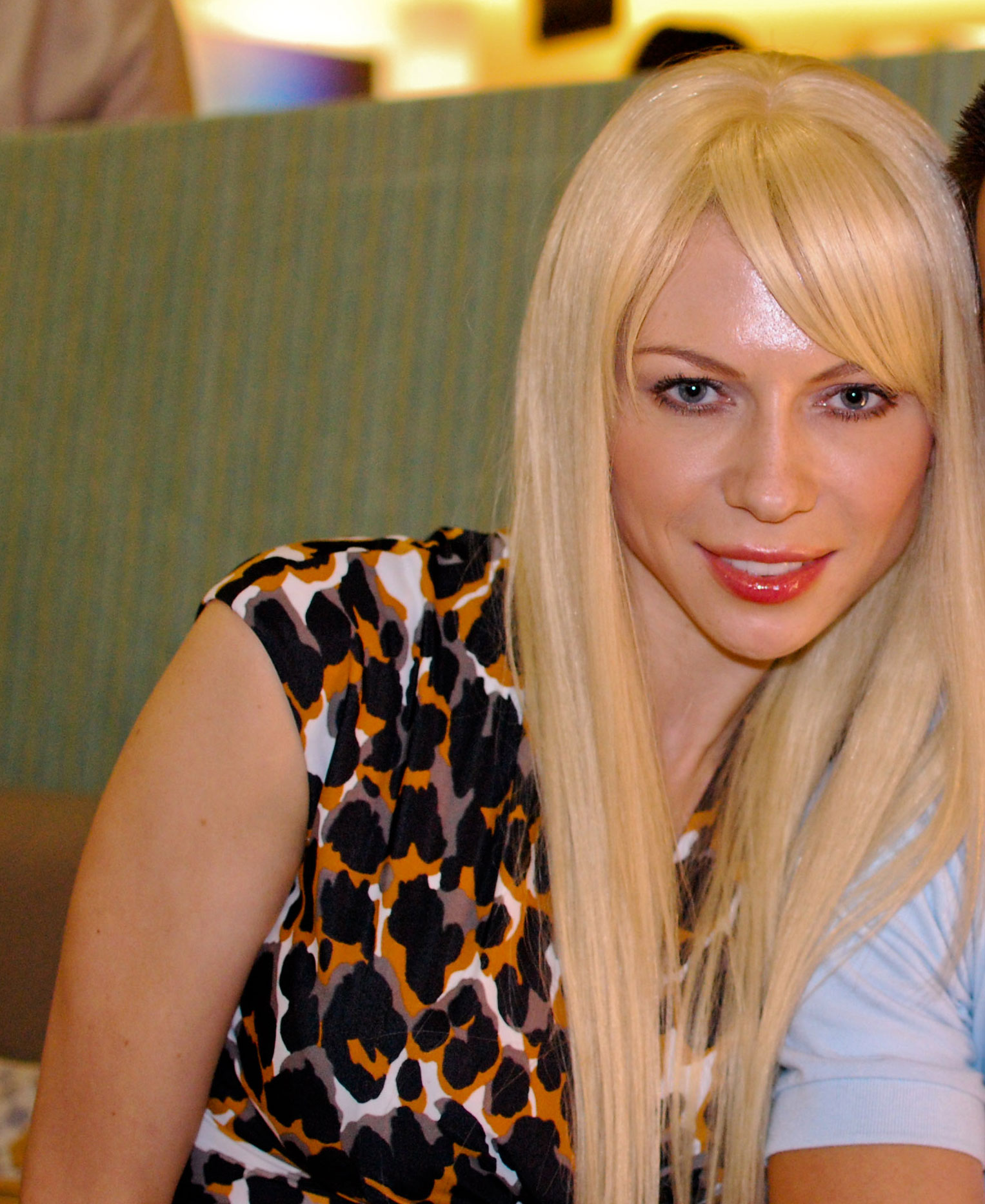
Orlova in January 2010

In February 2007, The Hot for Words trademark was registered by Charles T. Como, a creator of internet sites for music bands, and the YouTube account Hotforwords was registered. The first video posted was "Intro to Philology ;-)" on 7 March 2007. Orlova said this was at a time when "everybody was uploading cleavage."

The theme of Orlova's website and YouTube videos, which begin with the tagline "Intelligence is Sexy," is tracing the origins of English words. Some of her entries focus on everyday words such as "irony" and "OK," while others address lengthy and rarely used words such as "floccinaucinihilipilification" and "antidisestablishmentarianism." Some entries also address idioms, including "let the cat out of the bag," "dressed to the nines," and "three sheets to the wind," or new words like the verb "to google."

Orlova appeared on the cover of the November 2009 issue of the wine, beer and spirits publication Mutineer Magazine, applying her word explanations to common beverage words. Orlova was profiled on "The Medium," an Internet feature of The New York Times Magazine.

The Moscow Times said "Marina exploits her blonde-bombshell looks to the maximum: She appears in her two-minute clips scantily clad, pouting and making doe eyes. This is surely the main factor in her success. However, while the number of scantily clad girls on the Internet is limitless, not all of them put so much intellectual effort into their success."

In an interview, Orlova explained how she got viewers interested in words: "How else could I attract them to words?" "Everyone knows that sex sells."

Orlova was reported as having become an advocate of GoDaddy in August 2009.

After having gone silent on her channel for many years, she posted videos on YouTube in 2021 (since deleted) suggesting she has mental health issues and was in and out of hospital because of the situation.

== Family ==
Orlova posted a video to her instagram account in 2024, mentioning she has a five year old daughter.

== Bibliography ==
- Orlova, Marina (2009). Hot for Words: Answers to All Your Burning Questions About Words and Their Meanings. New York: HarperCollins. ISBN 978-0061776311. LCCN 2008053684. OCLC 291193606.
