= Bayush Razgildeyev =

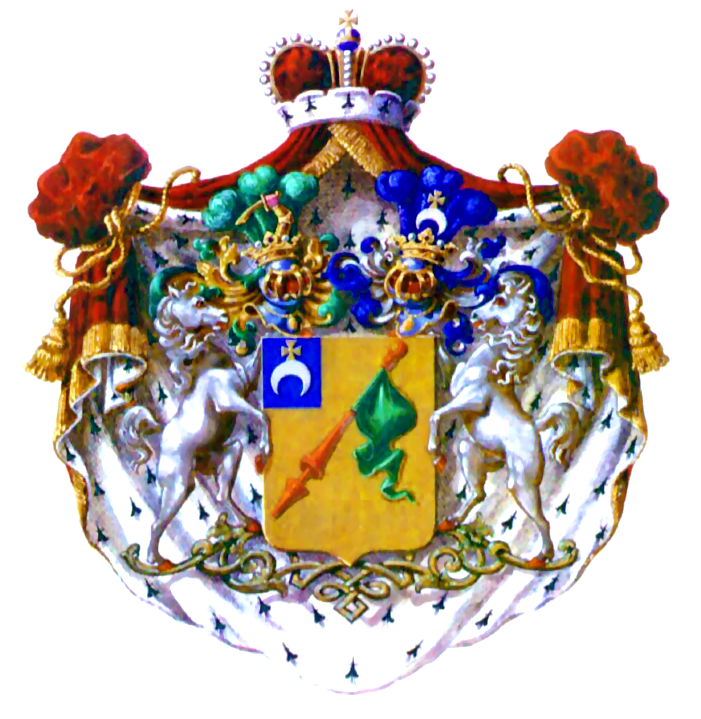
- Bayushev coat of arms
- Occupation: Warlord
- Known for: Defended Arzamas lands and defeated Nogays, killed 500 people, captured the enemy banner and freed about 7000 hostages

Prince Bayush Razgildeyev (Russian: князь Баюш Разгильдеев) was a Tatar warlord of the 17th century Time of Troubles. In 1612 he defended Arzamas lands and defeated Nogays, killed 500 people, captured the enemy banner, and freed about 7,000 hostages. For this feat he was awarded the title of Prince in 1613 by provisional rulers of wartime Russia, Trubetskoy and Pozharsky. This title was confirmed in 1618 by the czar Mikhail Feodorovich. He was the founder of Bayushev noble family in Russia.

== Literature ==
- Сборник исторических и статистических материалов о Симбирской губернии. Симбирск, 1868. — С. 259–261.
