= Alexander Stupin =

Russian painter and art teacher (1776–1861)

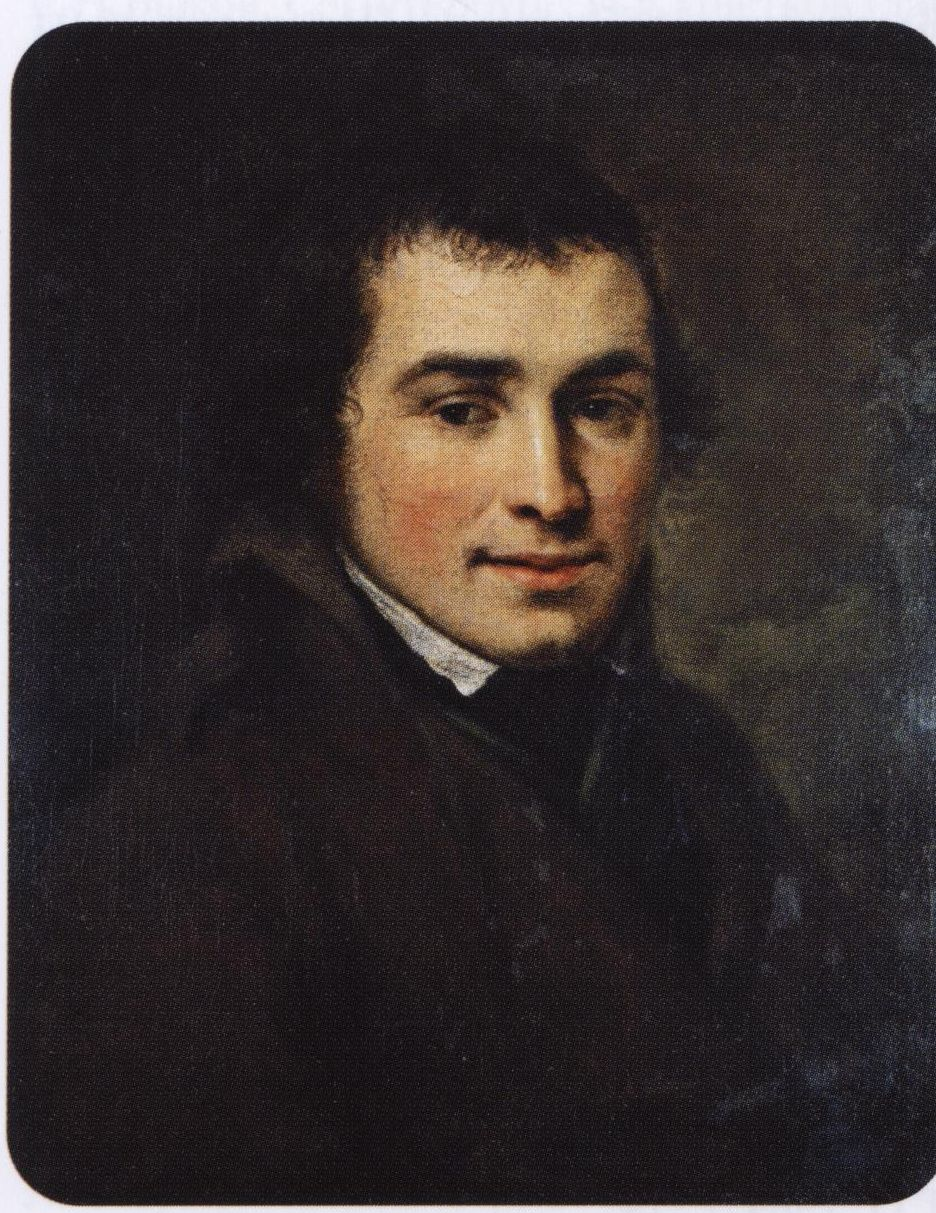
Alexander Stupin. Portrait by Alexander Varnek (1804)

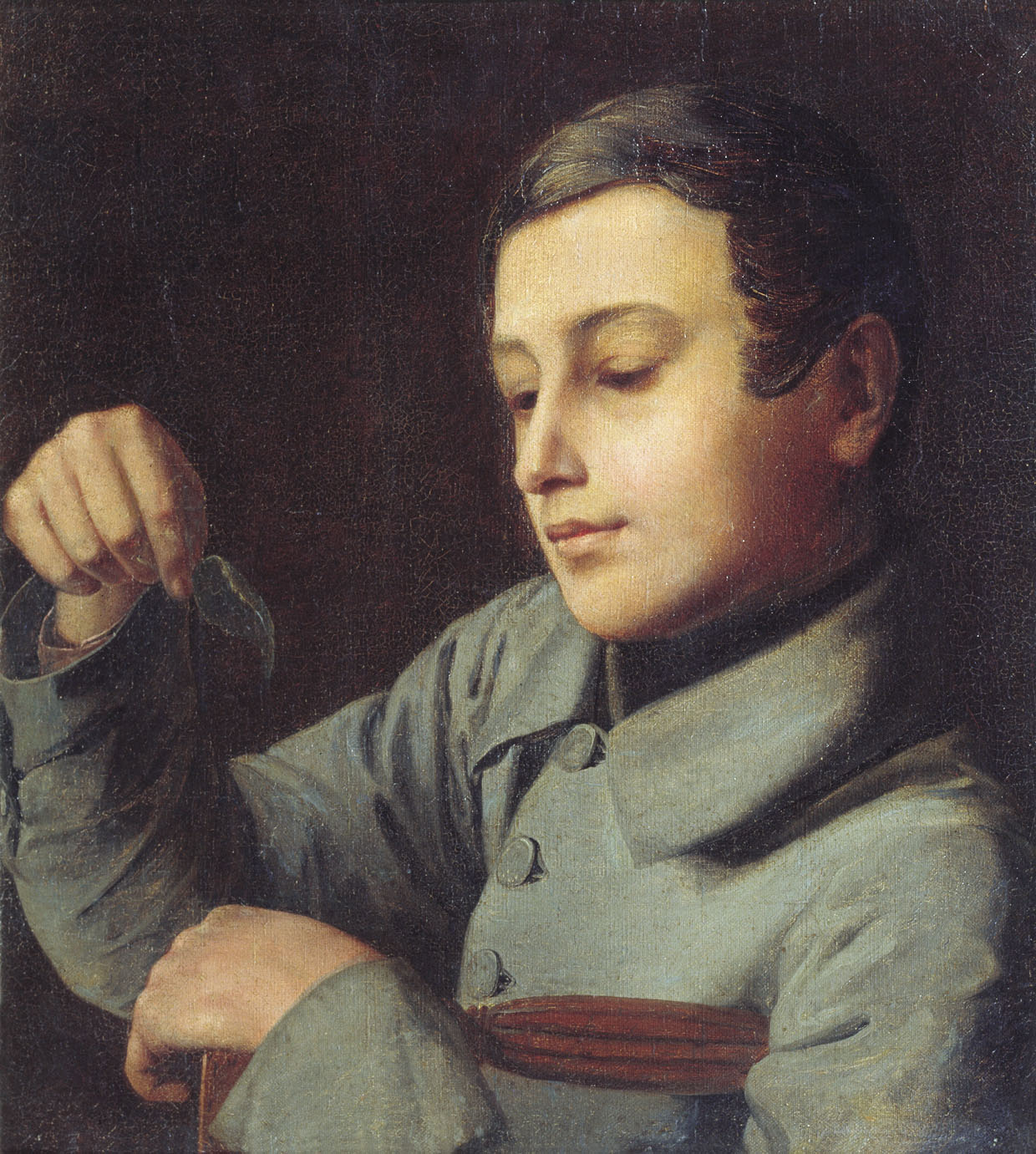
Boy with Leaf (1830s)

Alexander Vasilyevich Stupin (Russian: Александр Васильевич Ступин; 24 [O.S. 13] February 1776 in Arzamas – 12 August [O.S. 31 July] 1861 in Arzamas) was a Russian painter and art teacher. He founded and led the Arzamas School of Painting, Russia's first provincially based art school.

== Biography ==
He was the illegitimate son of a nobleman. In 1787, he became an apprentice at the icon-painting workshop in Temnikov. Upon completing his course in 1799, he went to Saint Petersburg for further studies at the Imperial Academy of Arts under Ivan Akimov. In 1802, he left with a certificate (second-degree) and 200 rubles for expenses, courtesy of the Academy's Director. He then returned to Arzamas where he used some of the money to start the first, and for a long time only, private art school outside a major city. In 1809, the Academy took a supportive interest in his school, honoring him with the title of "Academician" and sending original art works or plaster casts for his students to copy; issuing silver medals as incentives.

Many well-known artists began their studies with Stupin, including Evgraf Krendovsky, Vasily Raev and Vasily Perov. In 1836, finding himself overwhelmed by operating the school and teaching, he hired one of his former students to be superintendent. Seven years later, the school and his home were destroyed by a fire. He claimed that the fire was started by "envious" people, apparently choosing to ignore the fact that there had been tension between the school and the community due to the use of nude models and plaster statues, which one local priest had condemned as "idols". He recovered and rebuilt, however, and by 1846 there was a small museum with a library. In 1862, not long after Stupin's death, the school was closed.

== Personal life ==
Alexander Stupin had a son Rafael Stupin (1798-1860s) who was also a painter. Rafael studied painting at the Academy in St. Petersburg from 1809 until 1818; he was granted the title of Academician in 1829. He is known to have taught for a time at a school in Arzamas.
