= Arzamas train disaster =

1988 accidental detonation of explosives on a train in Arzamas, Gorky Oblast, USSR

Coordinates: 55°24′43″N 43°47′14″E

Arzamas explosion / Arzamas train disaster
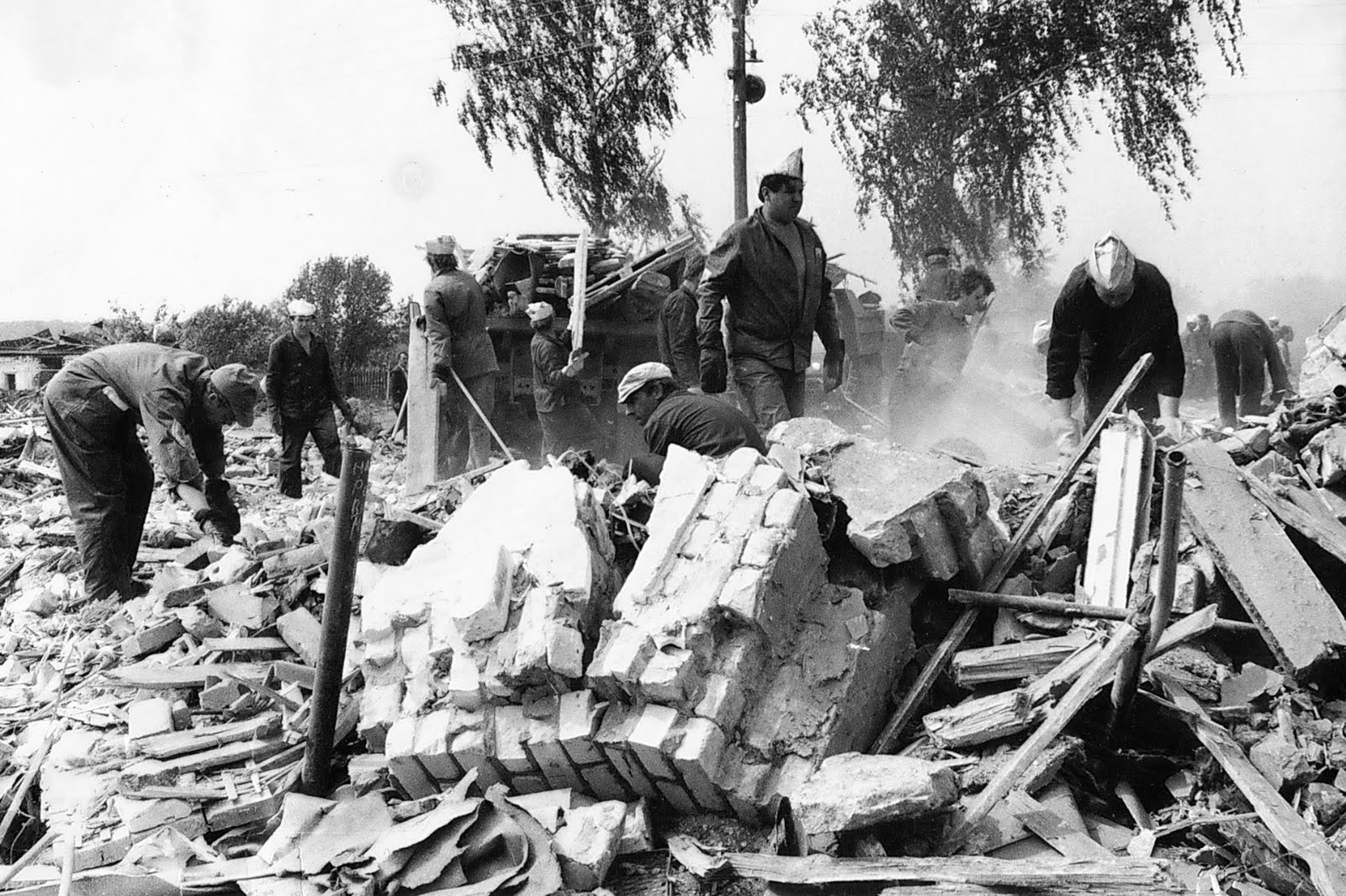

Details
- Date: 4 June 1988; 9:32
- Location: Arzamas-1 station
- Country: Soviet Union
- Incident type: Explosion

Statistics
- Deaths: 91
- Injured: 1,500

The Arzamas explosion, also known as the Arzamas train disaster, was a railway accident that occurred on June 4, 1988, in Arzamas, Gorky Oblast, Soviet Union, when an explosion at a railway crossing killed 91 people and injured 1,500. The Arzamas train disaster occurred exactly a year before the Ufa train disaster, one of the deadliest railway accidents in Soviet and Russian history.

== Explosion ==
A freight train featuring three goods wagons carrying 118 tonnes of explosives from Dzerzhinsk to the Kazakh SSR exploded at a railway crossing near the Arzamas-1 train station when hexogen included in the load detonated for unknown reasons, also detonating the other explosives stored in the wagons. The explosion also caused major damage to Arzamas, creating a 26-metre-deep (85 ft) crater, destroying or damaging 151 buildings including two hospitals, 49 kindergartens, 14 schools and 69 stores, and leaving around 823 families homeless. It destroyed 250 metres (820 ft; 273 yd) of railway track, an electrical substation, some power lines, and damaged the gas pipeline and the railway station.

== Investigation ==
The officially accepted cause of the explosion is considered to be violation of the rules of loading and transport of explosives. Alternative theories by some, including Governor of Nizhny Novgorod Oblast Gennady Khodyrev, have believed the explosion was planned as a terrorist act or as the actions of foreign special services with the purpose of forcing instability in the Soviet Union.

== See also ==
- Ufa train disaster
