= Alexander Raevsky (pilot) =

Russian aviator

Aleksandr Mikhailovich Rayevskiy
- Александр Раевский
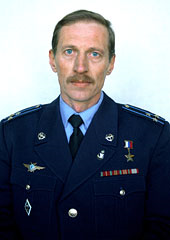
- Born: August 30, 1957
- Died: August 30, 2008 (aged 51)
- Known for: Test pilot for the Russian military
- Awards: Hero of the Russian Federation

Aleksandr Mikhailovich Rayevskiy (Russian: Александр Михайлович Раевский, 30 August 1957, Pastavy, Vitsebsk Voblast, Belarus - 30 August 2008) was a test pilot for the Russian military. While flying inside Russia and in Belarus, he has achieved 2300 hours of flight time, piloting various aircraft as the Su-27 and the Mig-29, and has over 200 accident-free landings on top of aircraft carriers. Due to his work as a test pilot and of his record, he was awarded the title of Hero of the Russian Federation.

He died in a car accident.

== See also ==
- List of Heroes of the Russian Federation
- Timur Apakidze
