= Alexander Raevsky (aviator) =

Russian aviator

- Александр Раевский
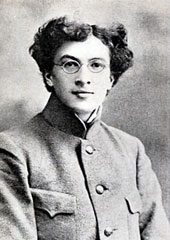
- Born: 22 May 1887; Kharkov Governorate, Russian Empire
- Died: 7 October 1937 (aged 50)
- Citizenship: Russian Empire; Soviet Union
- Education: Imperial University of Dorpat
- Occupations: Aircraft pilot, Aviator
- Known for: one of the founders of flight science in Russia
- Awards: Order of Saint Stanislaus; Order of St. Anna; Cross of St. George

Alexander Evgenievich Raevsky (22 May 1887 – 7 October 1937) was a Russian aviator, one of the founders of flight science in Russia.

== Life and career ==
He came from an old noble family. He studied at a classical gymnasium in Yuryev (now, Tallinn). He graduated from the Faculty of Physics and Mathematics of the Imperial University of Dorpat. In November 1908 he was called up for military service. In 1911 he graduated from the flight school of Louis Blériot in France. Since June 1911, he was a pilot leader at the aviation school of the Imperial All-Russian Aero Club. In 1913, he was sent to France for the second time to study at the High School of Aerobatics, from which he graduated in April 1914. Upon returning to Russia, he made many demonstration flights around Russia, including nine «dead loops». One of them, performed at a height of 40 meters, became a world record. He entered the top five «looplists». From August 1914, he supervised the training of pilots at the Sevastopol Military Aviation School (Kacha, Sevastopol).

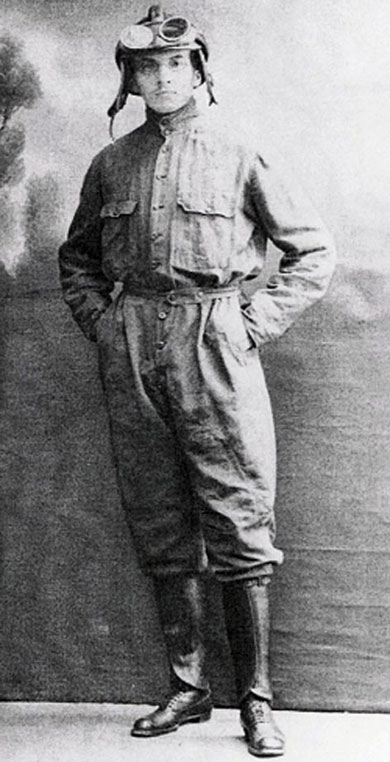
Alexander Raevsky in flight uniform

With the outbreak of the First World War, he fought on the Southwestern Front as part of the 32nd Corps Aviation Detachment. For daring reconnaissance flights and bombing of enemy targets, he was awarded the rank of ensign. He participated in the meeting and air escort of the Supreme Commander-in-Chief, Emperor Nicholas II (1915), who made an inspection trip to the Southwestern Front. In May 1916, he was awarded the title of “military pilot”. In August 1917 he enlisted in the 10th aviation detachment.

After the October Revolution of 1917, he was in charge of the aero station at the main airfield in Kherson. From May 1919 in the Red Army: until the end of the year he was assistant commander of the Moscow Aviation School. From February 1920 on test work in the flight department of the Main Air Force. Celebrating the 10th anniversary of Raevsky's aviation activity, the magazine Bulletin of the Air Fleet wrote (1921):

"Over a 10-year period, the hero of the day flew on 32 different types of aircraft. Trained about two hundred pilots to fly." During this time, Raevsky spent about three thousand hours in the air. In September 1922, he stopped flying for health reasons and returned to the profession of a photographer. Since 1922, he headed the educational photo laboratory at the Air Fleet Academy named after Professor Nikolay Zhukovsky. From 1924 to 1930 he worked in the editorial office of the magazine Airplane and until 1932 at TsAGI. He is the author of the book The Heroic Age of Aviation. He was repressed and executed on 7 October 7 1937. He was posthumously rehabilitated.

=== Awards ===
- Order of St. Stanislaus, I and III degrees.
- Order of Saint Anna II and III degrees.
- Cross of St. George IV degrees.
