= Arzamas =

City in Nizhny Novgorod Oblast, Russia

Arzamas Арзамас
- City
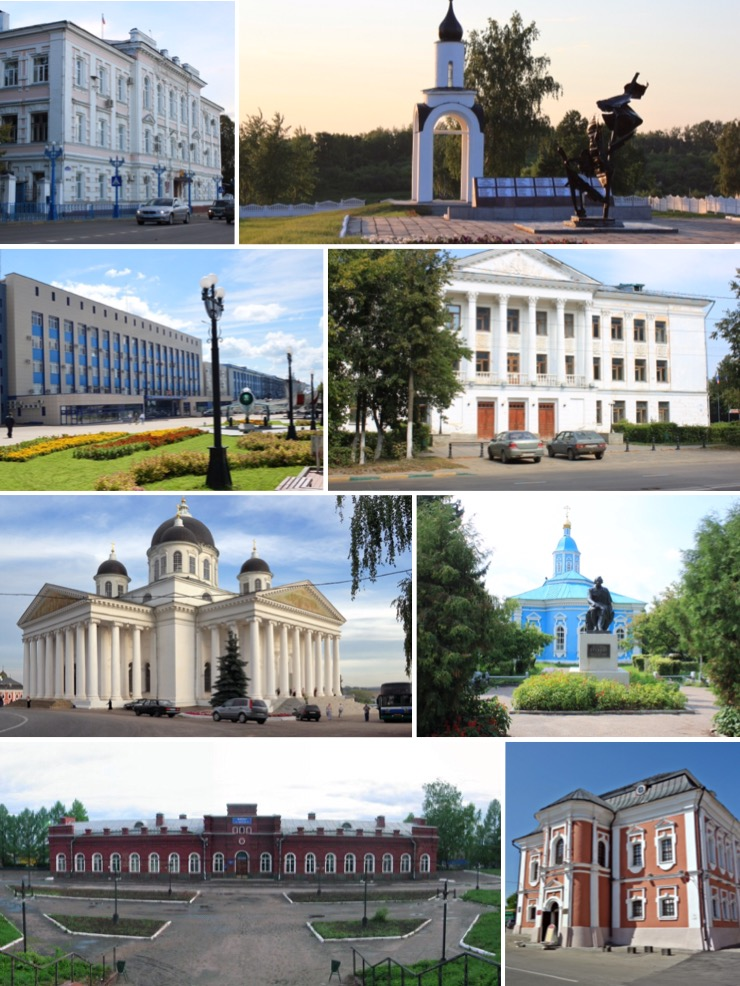
- Photomontage of Arzamas

- Flag Coat of arms
- Interactive map of Arzamas
- Location of Arzamas Arzamas (Nizhny Novgorod Oblast)
- Coordinates: 55°24′N 43°49′E
- Country: Russia
- Federal subject: Nizhny Novgorod Oblast
- Founded: 1578
- City status since: 1781

Government
  - Body: City Duma
  - Mayor: Alexander Shchelokov

Area
  - Total: 34.32 km^{2} (13.25 sq mi)
- Elevation: 150 m (490 ft)

Population (2010 Census)
  - Total: 106,362
  - Estimate (2025): 103,538 (−2.7%)
  - Rank: 152nd in 2010
  - Density: 3,099/km^{2} (8,027/sq mi)

Administrative status
  - Subordinated to: city of oblast significance of Arzamas
  - Capital of: Arzamassky District, city of oblast significance of Arzamas

Municipal status
  - Urban okrug: Arzamas Urban Okrug
  - Capital of: Arzamas Urban Okrug, Arzamassky Municipal District
- Time zone: UTC+3 (MSK)
- Postal code: 607220-607233
- Dialing code: +7 83147
- OKTMO ID: 22703000001

Arzamas (Russian: Арзама́с, IPA: [ɐrzɐˈmas]) is a city in Nizhny Novgorod Oblast, Russia, located on the Tyosha River (a tributary of the Oka), 410 kilometers (250 mi) east of Moscow. As of 2024, it has a population of 103,629.

== History ==
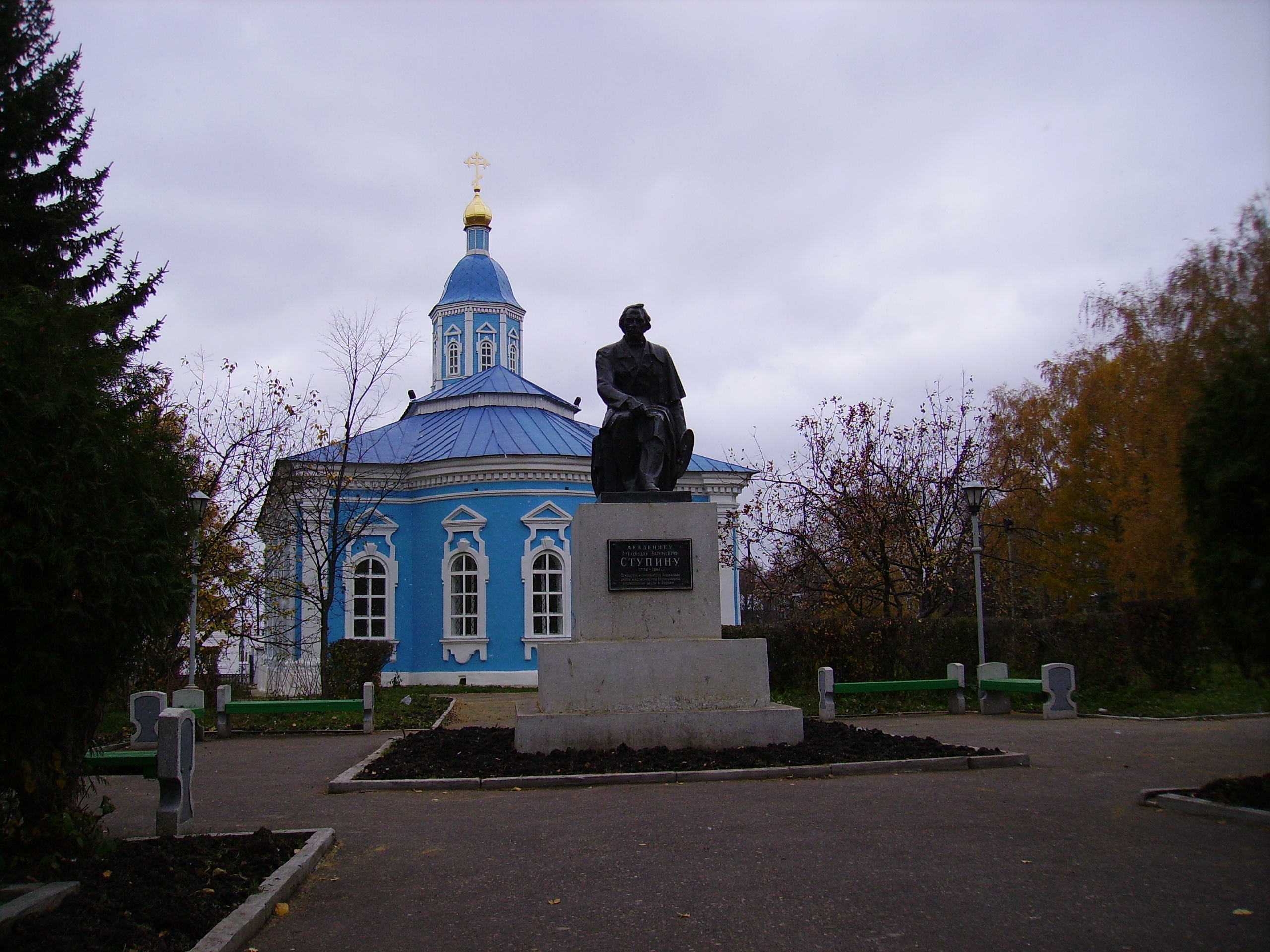
Monument to Alexander Stupin

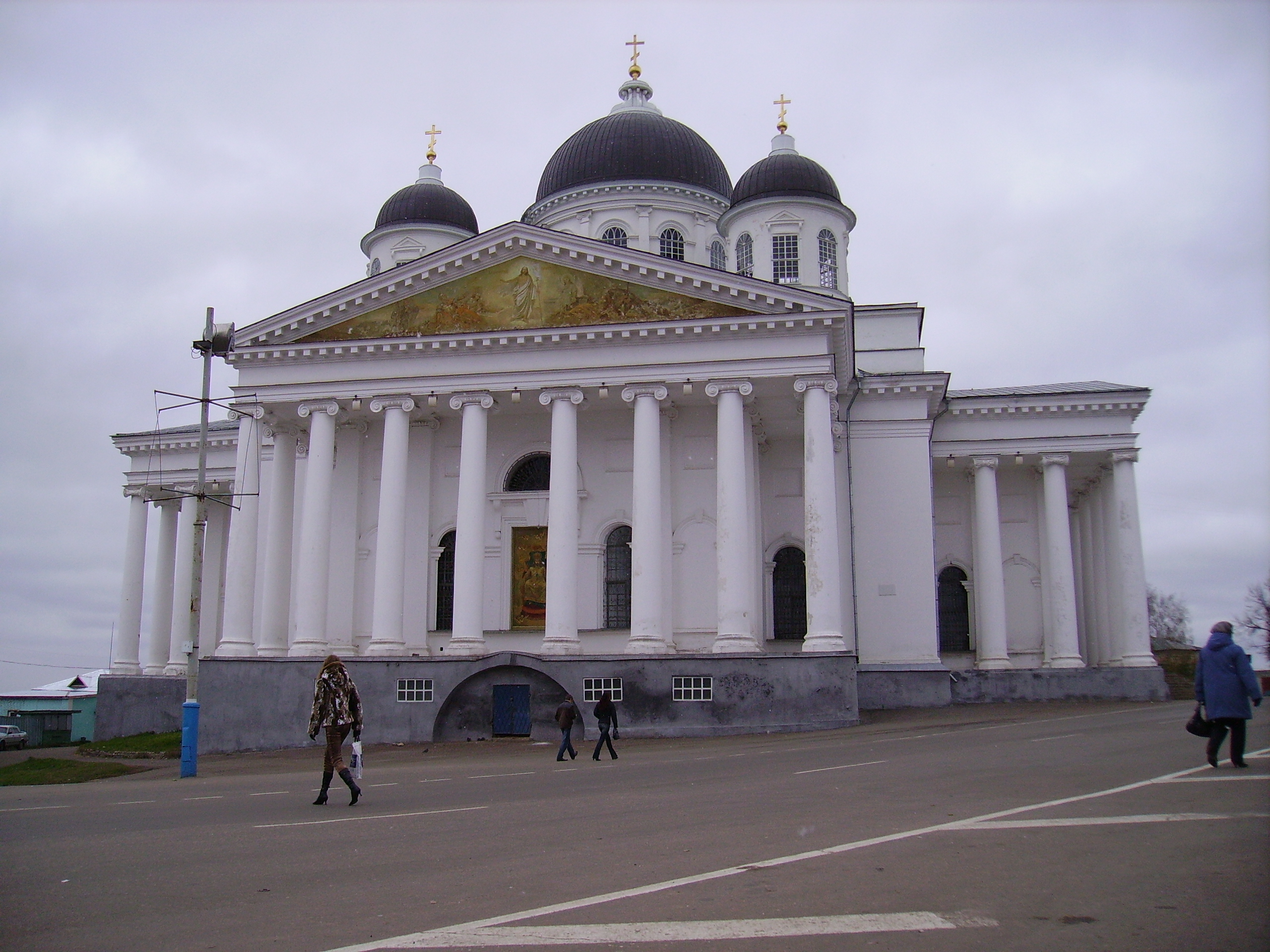
Resurrection Cathedral

Arzamas was founded in 1578, during the reign of Ivan the Terrible, in the lands populated at the time by Mordvins. By 1737, more than 7,000 people lived in Arzamas and the town became a major transit centre on the route from Moscow to eastern parts of Russia. It was known for its geese and onions as well as leather crafts.

Catherine the Great in 1781 granted town status to Arzamas and a coat of arms based on the colours of the Arzamas regiment. In the early 19th century, Arzamas had over twenty churches and cathedrals, the foremost being the Resurrection Cathedral. It was built in the Empire style to commemorate the Russian victory over Napoleon in 1812.

Alexander Stupin art school was located in Arzamas between 1802 and 1862 and many famous Russian artists studied there, including Vasily Perov.

By the early 20th century it was still an important centre of trade, and had tanneries, oil, flour, tallow, dye, soap and iron works; knitting was an important domestic industry, while sheepskins and sail-cloth were articles of trade. The 1897 population was 10,591.

From 1954 to 1957, Arzamas was the center of Arzamas Oblast, a short-lived administrative unit that was split from Gorky Oblast and later merged back into it.

In 1988, the city was the site of the Arzamas train disaster which caused the deaths of ninety-one people.

== Administrative and municipal status ==
Within the framework of administrative divisions, Arzamas serves as the administrative center of Arzamassky District, even though it is not a part of it. As an administrative division, it is incorporated separately as the city of oblast significance of Arzamas—an administrative unit with the status equal to that of the districts. As a municipal division, the city of oblast significance of Arzamas is incorporated as Arzamas Urban Okrug.

== Population ==
Ethnic composition (2010):

- Russians – 97.9%
- Ukrainians – 0.4%
- Others – 1.7%

== Economy ==
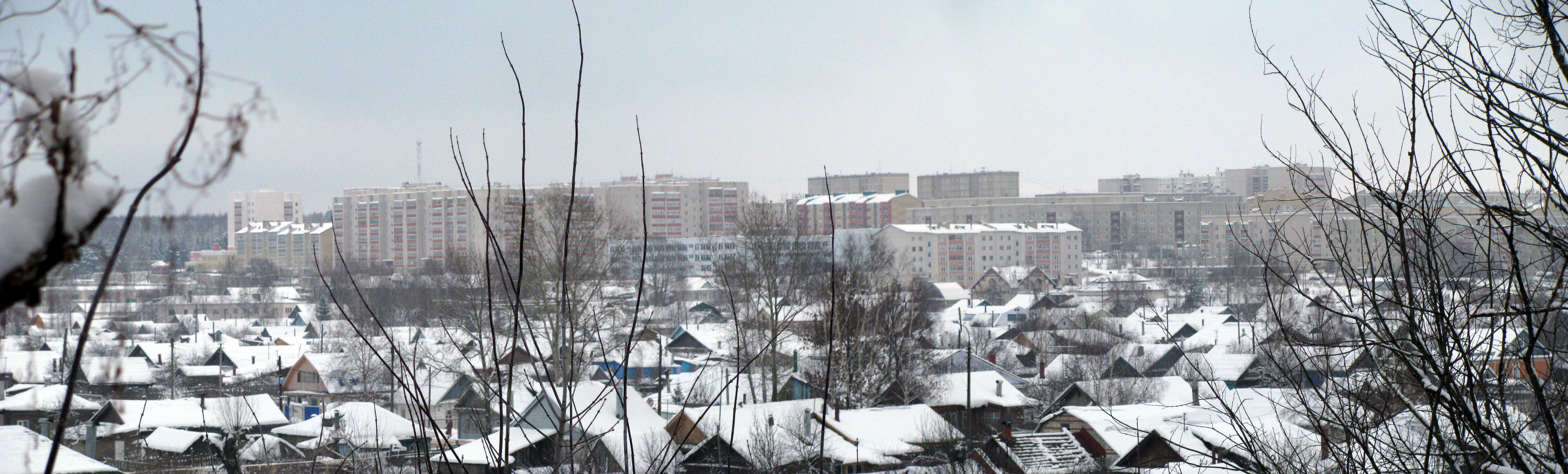
11th microdistrict of Arzamas

Local industry includes Arzamas Machine-Building Plant, a manufacturer of military and specialized civilian automotive vehicles (such as BTR-80, GAZ Tigr). It is now part of the GAZ holding company. Also in Arzamaz there is the Peshelansky gypsum plant, which has been operating since 1933.

== International relations ==
=== Twin towns and sister cities ===
Arzamas is twinned with:

- Popovo, Bulgaria
- Ruma, Serbia
- Valozhyn, Belarus
- New Athos, Abkhazia/Georgia
- (Autonomous Republic of Crimea) Alupka, Crimea
- Vagharshapat, Armenia

== Notable people ==
- Patriarch Sergius I of Moscow
- Marina Orlova, philologist
- Evgeny Namestnikov, ice hockey player
- Leonid Nikolaev, conductor
- Alexander Stupin, painter

== See also ==
- Arzamas I railway station
- Bayush Razgildeyev
- Sarov (Arzamas-16)
