= Forest railway =

Railway transport used for forestry tasks

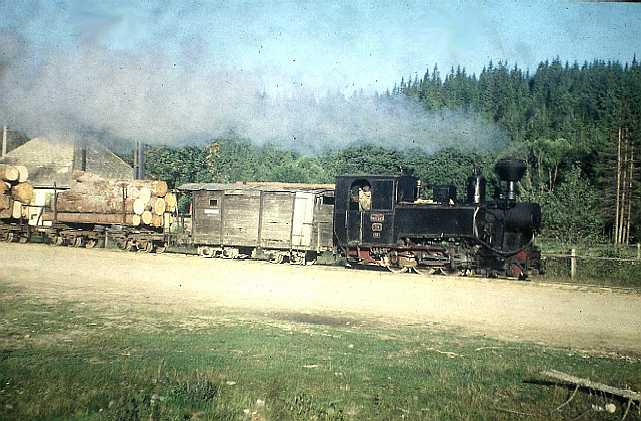
Forest railway operations in Comandău, Romania

A forest railway, forest tram, timber line, logging railway or logging railroad is a mode of railway transport which is used for forestry tasks, primarily the transportation of felled logs to sawmills or railway stations.

In most cases this form of transport utilised narrow gauges, and were temporary in nature, and in rough and sometimes difficult to access terrain.

== History ==
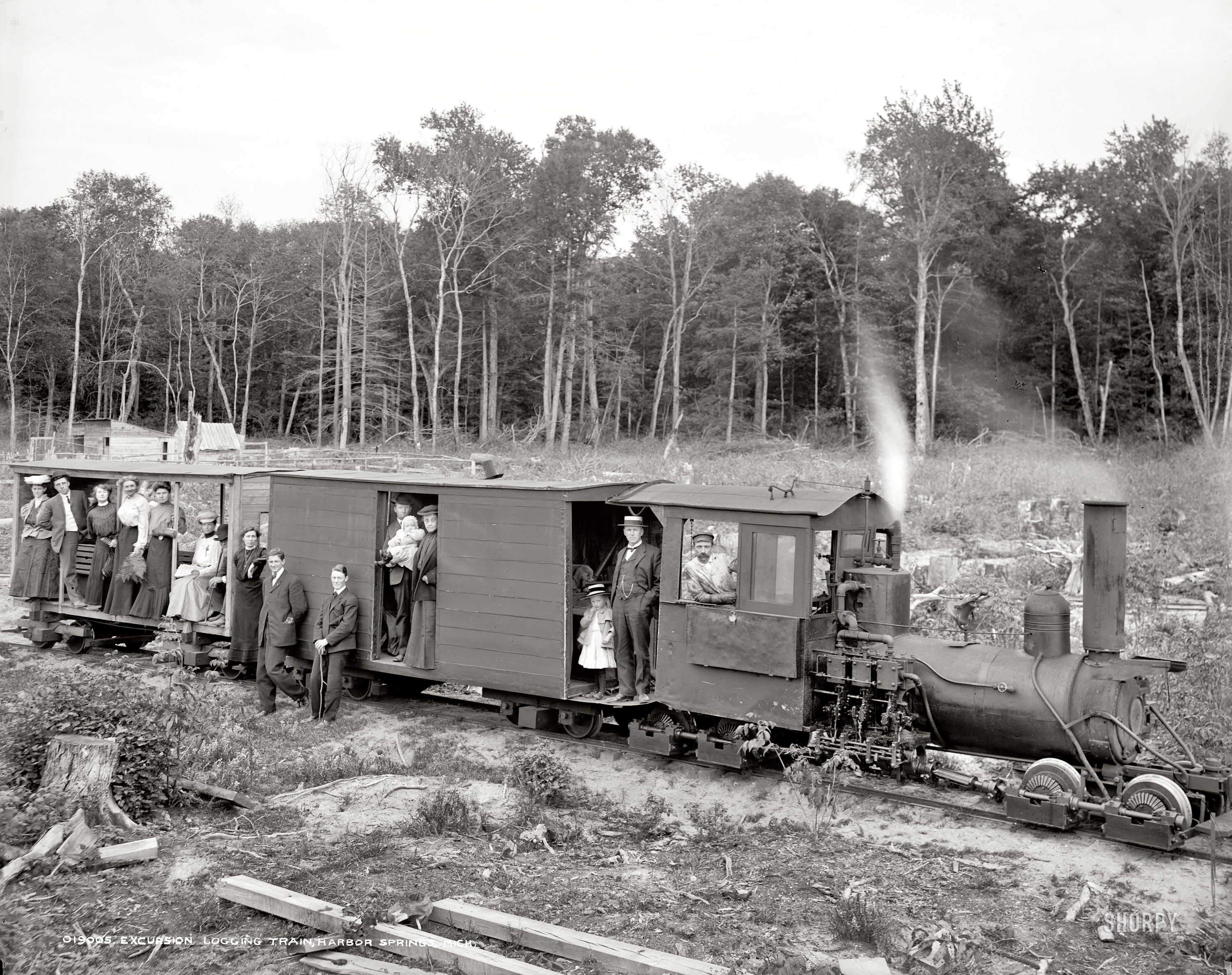
Shay locomotive on an American forest railway (Harbor Springs Railway)

Before the railway was invented, logs were transported in large numbers from the forest down rivers either freely or on wooden rafts. This was not without its problems and wood was often damaged in transit, lost in floods or stranded in shallow water. Suitable rivers were often unavailable in mountainous terrain.

Simple wagonways, using horses and wooden rails, were used from the 18th century. However the invention of the steam locomotive and steel rails soon led to these being employed for forestry. However the difficult terrain within forests meant that narrow-gauge railways, which took up less space, were lighter and easier to build and enabled tight curves to be laid, were preferred. These were the so-called forest railways. In particularly large areas of forest or forests of unusually large trees, such as in the northwestern US, extensive forest railways were even built using standard gauge exclusively for forestry tasks. Special geared locomotives such as the Shay and Climax locomotive were developed for high tractive effort on rough track. Some forest railways became common carriers when cleared forest land was converted to agricultural or recreational use.

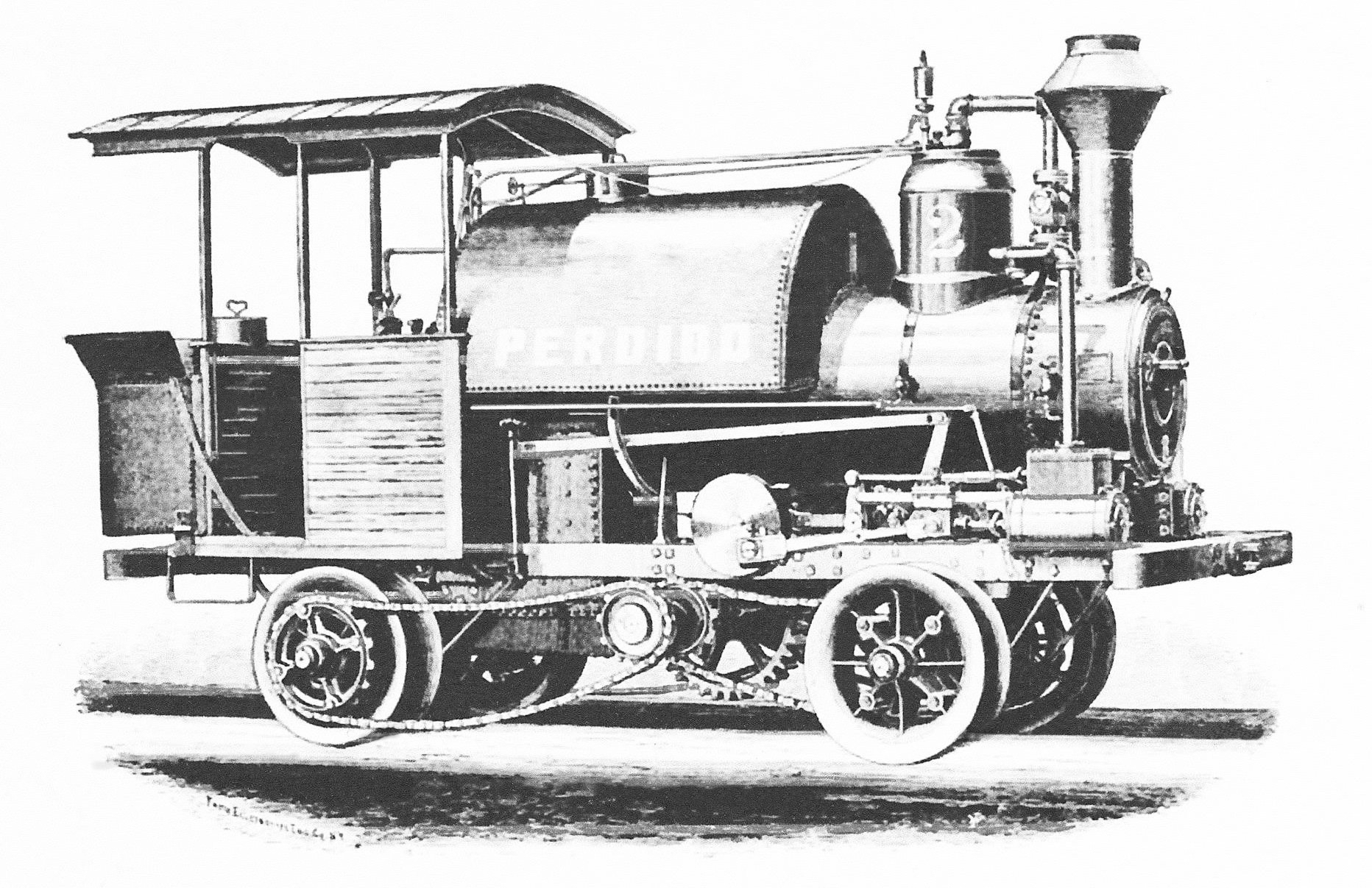
Perdido, a steam pole road locomotive

In cases where the railway itself was considered very short-term, or the region was extremely difficult to access, logs would often be laid into the ground as a pole road, rather than the cost and logistics of laying steel rails and sleepers. Pole roads could be extensive; several examples in the southeastern United States extended up to 20 miles (32 km) at the end of the nineteenth century, and used purpose-built steam locomotives.

In addition to steam traction, diesel and petrol-driven locomotives were also used later on. These largely brought animal-hauled transportation to an end on the forest railways. Also common were routes that just used gravity. Wagons loaded with wood would simply roll downhill in a controlled fashion under the pull of gravity. Foresters also travelled on these, at some risk to their lives on occasions – as brakemen. Empty wagons were hauled uphill again by horses.

From the second half of the 20th century forest railways were threatened by road transportation and by the end of the 1960s they had practically disappeared from western Europe. Roads were often laid in their place on the old trackbeds.

In a few Eastern European countries forest railways survived longer, particularly in Russia where there are still some today. In Hungary too there are several forest railways in active service today, some are also used for tourist traffic. The numerous forest railway operations in Romania were closed, with a few exceptions, by the 1990s. In Western Europe there are very few which are even preserved as museum railways.

In Asia and Oceania (Australia and New Zealand) the history and fate of logging tramways/forest railways is similar to Europe, with most lines either converted to motorised truck transport or closing down in the 1960s. Significant numbers of locomotives and other remnants of the former lines are found in museums and museum railways in Australia.

== Forest railways in Europe ==
=== Austria ===
Railway name	Route	Track gauge mm	Length km	Traction	From	To	Operated<r>by	Remarks
Lower Austria
Haselbach Forest Railway	Forsthaus-Hochwiese	600	~2.5	Gravity, oxen, petrol-driven locos	1915	1918	BMF	demolished
Forest Railway im Klauswald	Klauswald, near Puchenstuben	600?	4.5		1930	1937	WbK	
Langau-Lackenhofer Höfe Forest Railway	Langau-Lackenhof	1000	~7	Horses	~1845	1867	WbLL	
Lunz-Langau-Saurüsselboden Forest Railway	Lunz am See-Langau-Saurüsselboden	700	18.8	Diesel	1920	1974	WbLL	limited public passenger services, demolished
Naßwald Forest Railway	Schwarzau im Gebirge	600	0.6	Diesel, accumulator	1985			museum railway
Wastl am Wald - Hühnerkogel Forest Railway	Wastl am Wald	600	~4		1934	1945	WbW	
Forest Railway im Weinsberger Forst	Martinsberg-Gutenbrunn -Berglucke	760	~36		1920	1933	WWF	
Upper Austria
Offensee Forest Railway	Steinkogl-Steibachl-Obere Moosau	800	15.5		1899	1954	WbO	
Reichraming Forest Railway	Schallau-Maieralm-Hansigraben	760	16.5		1920	1971	WbRr	limited public passenger services, demolished
Reichraming Forest Railway	Maieralm-Unterweißwasser	760	13.0		1920	1971	WbRr	limited public passenger services, demolished
Reichraming Forest Railway	Reichraming-Hintergebirge	760	32.7	Diesel	1920	1971	WbRr	limited public passenger services, demolished
Burgenland
Dörfl Forest Railway	Dörfl	600	9.4		1924	1933	WbD	
Großmürbisch Forest Railway	(Alsörönök-) Großmürbisch-Reinersdorfer Bach	760	~7.5		1935	1937	WbG	border crossing, demolished
Großpetersdorf-Rumpersdorf Forest Railway	Großpetersdorf-Rumpersdorf	760	~13.5		1920	~1933	WGR	
Güssing - Neuberg im Burgenland Forest Railway	Güssing-Neuberg im Burgenland	760	~14		1913	1921	WGN	
Güssing - Rohr im Burgenland Forest Railway	Güssing-Rohr im Burgenland	760	~27		1913	1921	WGR	
Lockenhaus Forest Railway	Lockenhaus	600	14.9		1926	1956	WbL	
Punitz Forest Railway	Punitz-Punitzer Gemeindewald	600	~9	Horses	1905	~1933	WbP	
Salzburg
Zinkenbach Forest Railway	Lagerplatz Hundsleiten-Königsbachalm	700	6.7	Diesel	1921	1967	WbZ	no passenger traffic, demolished
Styria
Deutschlandsberg Forest Railway	Deutschlandsberg-Freiland bei Deutschlandsberg	760	9.9	Steam			WbD	no passenger traffic, demolished
Deutschlandsberg Forest Railway	Hofbauer-Kupper-Bärental	600	17.9	Steam			WbD	between Kupper and Freiland (3.1 km) with cable car, no passenger traffic between Hofbauer and Kupper, demolished
Feistritzwaldbahn	Steinhaus am Semmering-Rettenegg	600	22.0	Steam	1902	1958	WbF	limited public passenger services, with two inclined lifts, demolished
Frohnleiten Forest Railway	Frohnleiten-Traninger-Rossstall	760	12.4		1925	1951	WbF	demolished
Frohnleiten Forest Railway	Traninger-Dionys	760	5.6		1925	1951	WbF	demolished
Gundersdorf Forest Railway	Dampfsäge-Höllein	760	4.0				WbG	demolished
Ingering Forest Railway	Ingering-Seeboden	720	~10.5		~1885	1938	WbI	demolished
Radmer Forest Railway	Hieflau-Radmer-Neuhaus	830	~14		1920	1967	WbRa	
Radmer Forest Railway	Hieflau-Radmer-Neuhaus	900	~14	1200 V DC	1967	1979	WbRa	
Trieben Forest Railway	Trieben-Lager Seyfried	800	~10.8		1900	~1939	WbT	
Tyrol
Klammbachwaldbahn	Achenkirch	760	6.6		1914	1960		
Bächental Forest Railway	Bächentalbahn	750		10.2	1930	1956		border crossing

=== France ===
- Abreschviller Forest Railway, remains of a once extensive networks in the Vosges, museum railway
- Voies Ferrées des Landes a group of short lines built primarily to serve the forestry industry in the Landes forest
- The Forest Railway Welschbruch, built and used while the German Empire ruled Alsace, was used to carry wood logs down to the valley of Barr

=== Germany (selection) ===
Railway name	Route	State	Track gauge mm	Length km	From	To	Remarks
Ebersberg Forest Railway	Ebersberg	Bavaria					demolished
Reichswald Forest Railway	Sebalder Reichswald	Bavaria					demolished
Ruhpolding–Reit im Winkl State Forest Railway	Ruhpolding-Reit im Winkl	Bavaria	1000	23	1922	1936/37	demolished
Schorfheide Forest Railway	Döllnkrug-Höpen	Bradenburg	600				
Spiegelau Forest Railway	Spiegelau-Finsterau	Bavaria	600	<100	1909	1960	demolished
Waldeisenbahn Muskau	Weißwasser-Bad Muskau	Saxony	600	>50	1895		museum railway
Wasgau Forest Railway	Bundenthal-Rumbach	Rhineland-Palatinate	600	14,5	1921	1930	demolished
Zwieselau Forest Railway	Zwieselau-Buchenau	Bavaria	600	14,5	1930	1958	demolished

=== Hungary ===
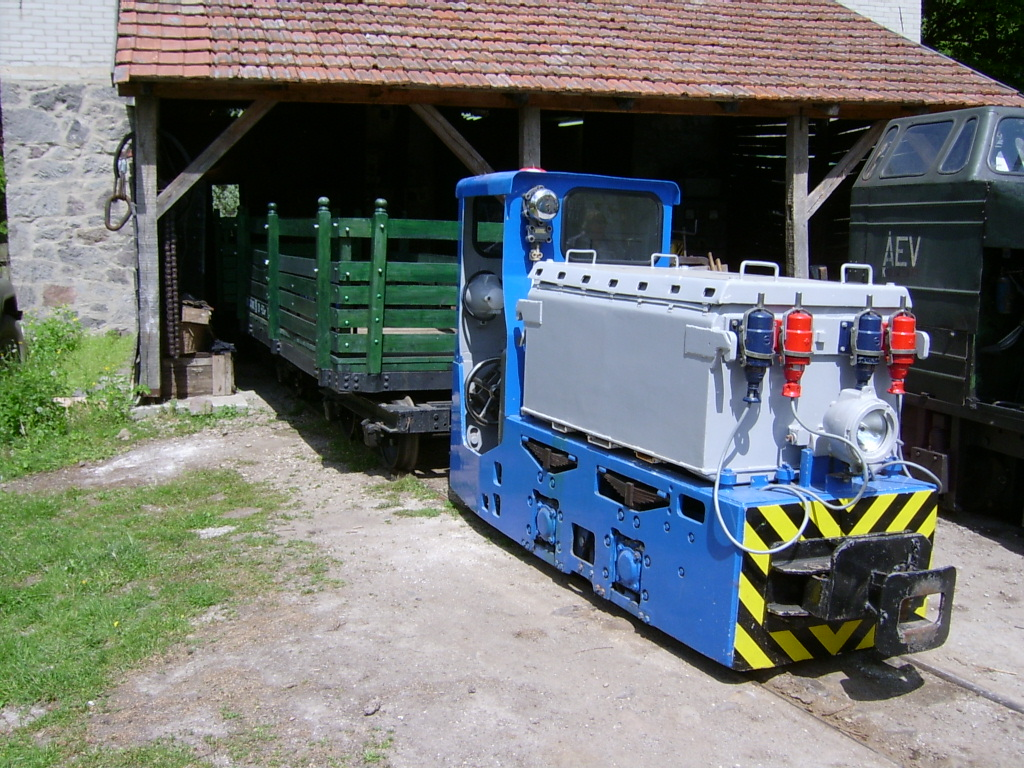
Tourist trains and narrow gauge museum at the Kemence Forest Museum Railway

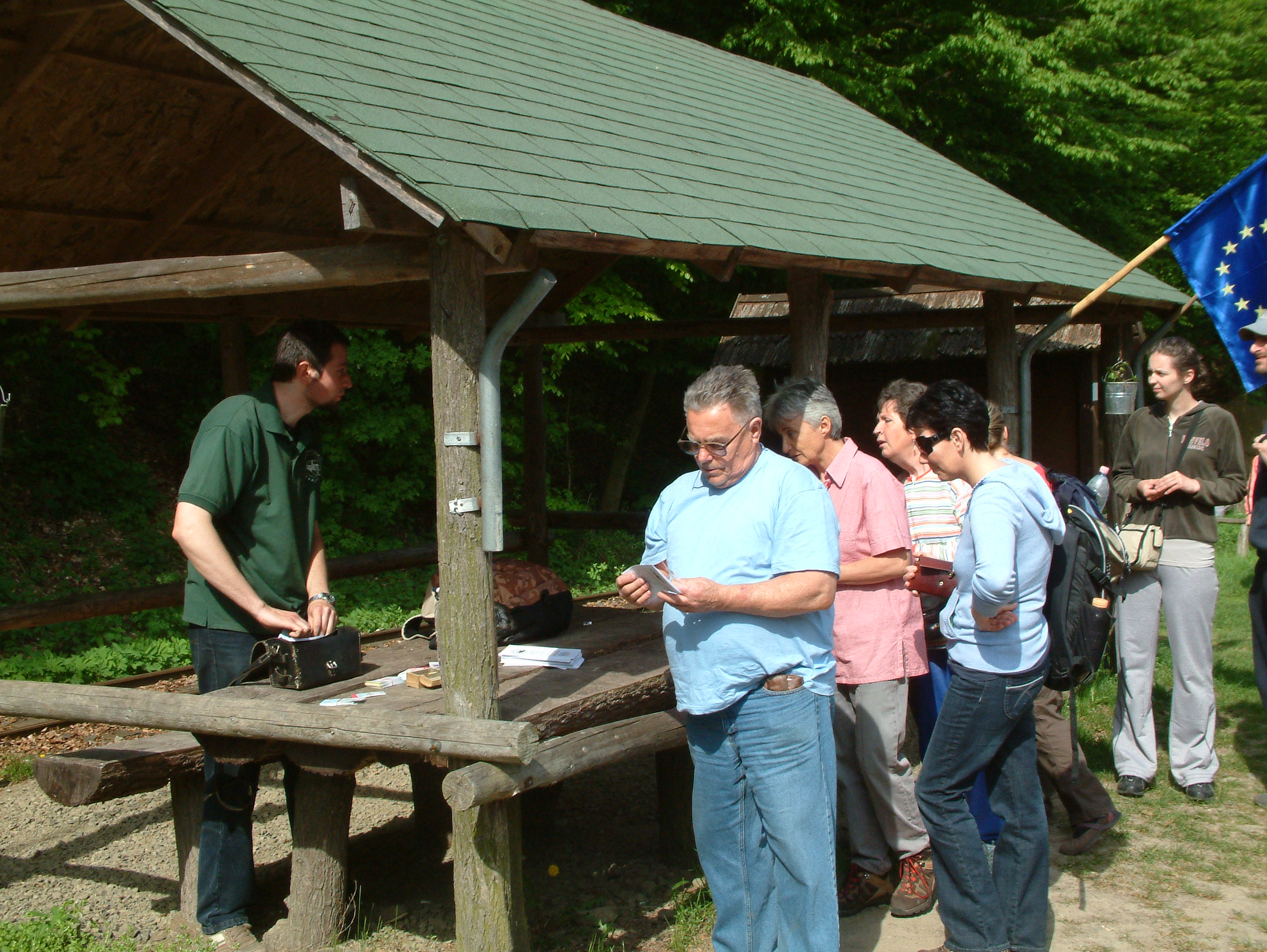
Ticket vending on the Szob-Nagybörzsöny forest railway

All forest railways have tourist trains

- Almamellék State Forest Railway
- Csömödér State Forest Railway, active forest railway
- Debrecen Forest Railway
- Felsőtárkány National Forest Railway
- Gemenc State Forest Railway, active forest railway
- Gyöngyös State Forest Railway
- Kaszó Forest Railway
- Kemence Forest Museum Railway
- Királyrét State Forest Railway
- Lillafüred Forest Train
- Mesztegnyő Forest Railway
- Pálháza State Forest Railway
- Szilvásvárad Forest Railway
- Szob-Nagybörzsöny forest railway

=== Poland ===
- Bieszczady Forest Railway
- Czarna Białostocka Forest Railway, from 1919
- Hajnówka Museum Railway
- Płociczno-Bryzgiel, from 1923

=== Romania ===
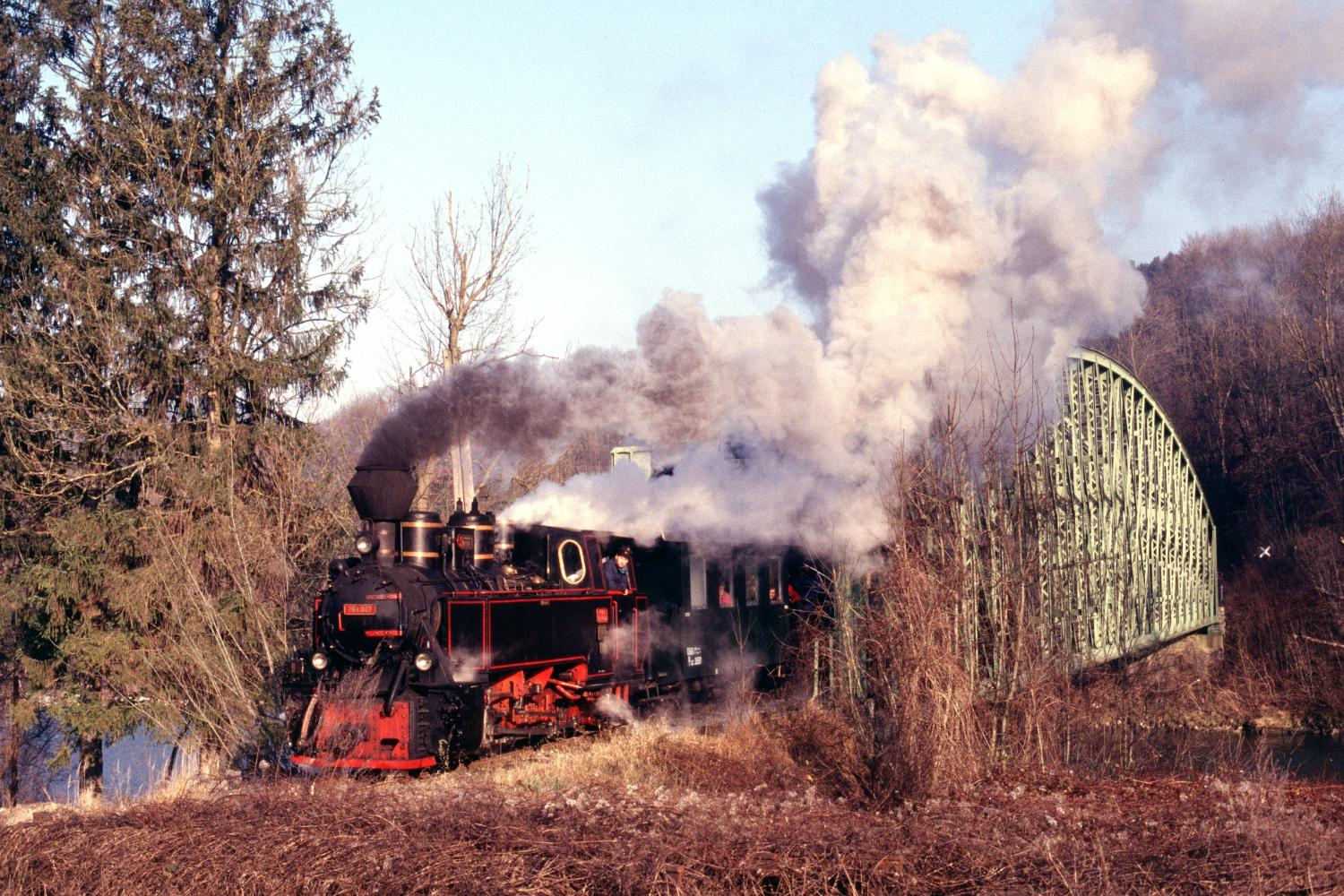
Romanian forest railway loco on the Steyrtalbahn

- Viseu de Sus, Wassertalbahn, active forest railway used for forestry and tourism
- Covasna-Comandău Forest Railway, with cable car, museum operation under construction

=== Russia ===
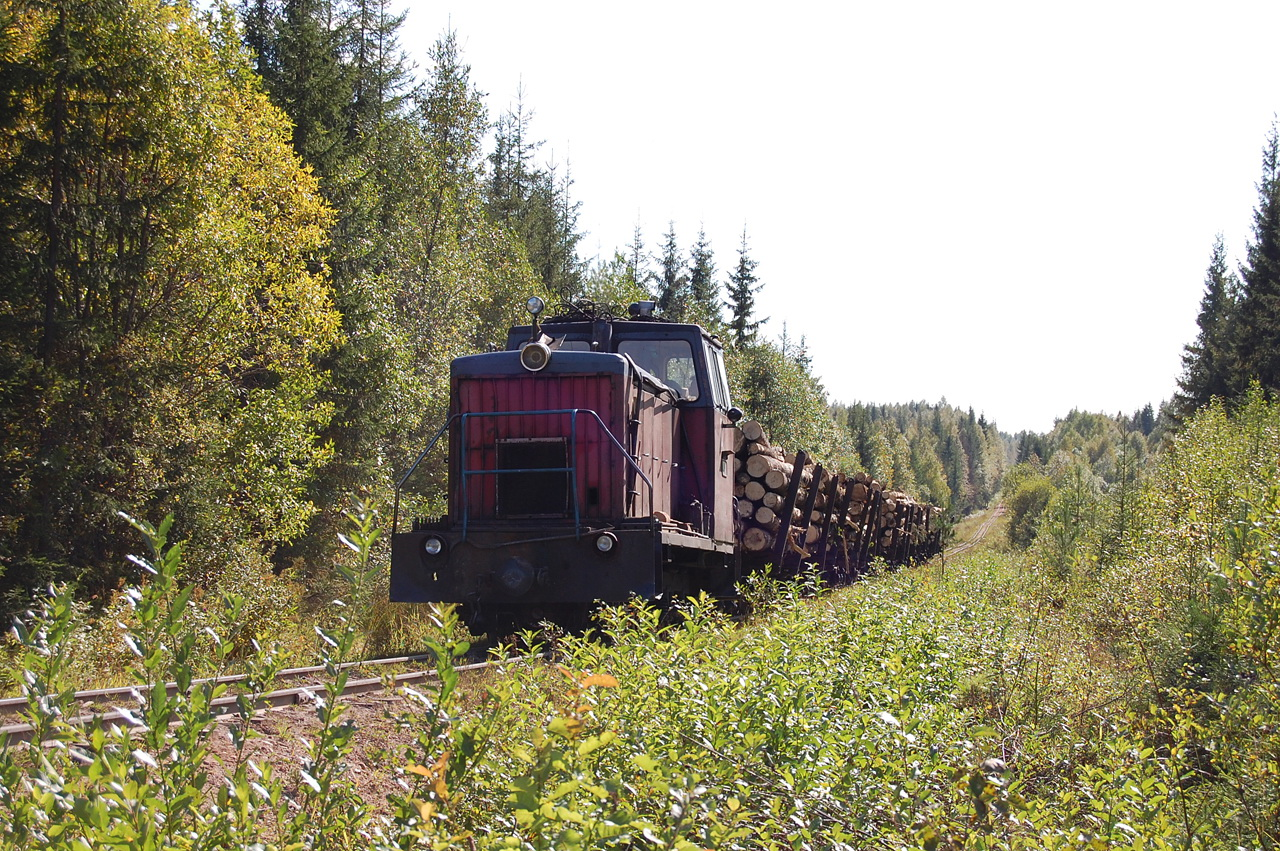
Russian loco TU6A with a log train on the Udimskaya Forest Railway

For passengers and tourist:

- Alapayevsk, Sverdlovsk Oblast
- Severodvinsk, Arkhangelsk Oblast
- Sharya Forest Museum Railway, Kostroma Oblast

Active forest railways:

- Apsheronsk, Krasnodar Krai
- Belorucheyskaya, Vologda Oblast
- Kobrinskaya, Kirov Oblast
- Konetsgorskaya, Arkhangelsk Oblast
- Loyginskaya, Arkhangelsk & Vologda Oblasts
- Nyubskaya, Arkhangelsk Oblast
- Lundanskaya, Kirov Oblast
- Oparino, Kirov Oblast
- Pizhemskaya, Nizhny Novgorod Oblast
- Udimskaya, Arkhangelsk Oblast
- Zelennikovskaya, Arkhangelsk Oblast

=== Slovakia ===
All forest railways are only museums

- Čierny Hron Railway (Schwarzgranbahn)
- Historical Logging Switchback Railway
- Považská lesná železnica (Waagwaldbahn)

=== Sweden ===
- Ohsabanan, active forest railway and tourist trains

== Logging railroads in North America ==
A logging railroad describes railroads, pole roads, tram roads, or similar infrastructure used to transport harvested timber from a logging site to a sawmill. Logging railroads vary in gauge and length, with most forested regions of the world supporting a railroad of this type at some point.

While most railroads of this variety were temporary, it was not uncommon for permanent railroads to take their place as a complement to logging operations or as an independent operation once logging ended.

=== Canada ===
- Emery Lumber Company Railway, Greater Sudbury, Ontario
- Englewood Railway, British Columbia
- Shaw Logging Railroad, Saskatchewan
- Stone Lumber Company Railway, St. Joseph Island, Ontario
- Springfield Railway, Nova Scotia
- Weymouth and New France Railway, Nova Scotia

=== Mexico ===
- Ferrocarril Cazadero la Torre y Tepetongo
- Bosques de Chihuahua

=== United States ===
==== California ====
- Almanor Railroad
- Arcata and Mad River Railroad
- Bear Harbor and Eel River Railroad
- Boca and Loyalton Railroad
- Bucksport and Elk River Railroad
- California Western Railroad
- Camino, Placerville and Lake Tahoe Railroad
- Caspar, South Fork and Eastern Railroad
- Diamond and Caldor Railway
- Diamond Match Company
- Feather River Railway
- Fort Bragg and Southeastern Railroad
- Goodyear Redwood Company
- Gualala River Railroad
- Lake Valley Railroad
- Madera Sugar Pine Company
- McCloud Railway
- Mendocino Lumber Company
- Metropolitan Redwood Lumber Company
- Michigan-California Lumber Company
- North Pacific Coast Railroad
- Oregon and Eureka Railroad
- Pacific Lumber Company
- Rockport Redwood Company
- Santa Cruz Lumber Company
- Sugar Pine Lumber Company
- Usal Redwood Company
- West Side Lumber Company railway
- Yosemite Lumber Company

Minnesota

- Brainerd and Northern Minnesota Railway
- Duluth and Iron Range Railroad
- Duluth and Northeastern Railroad
- Duluth and Northern Minnesota Railway
- Duluth, Missabe and Northern Railway
- Duluth, Mississippi River and Northern Railroad
- Duluth, Rainy Lake and Winnipeg Railway
- Duluth, Virginia & Rainy Lake Railway
- Gull Lake and Northern Railway
- Mesabe Southern Railway Company
- Minneapolis and Rainy River Railway
- Minneapolis, Red Lake and Manitoba Railway
- Minnesota and North Wisconsin Railroad
- Minnesota, Dakota and Western Railway
- Mitchell and McClure Logging Railroad
- Tower Logging Railway
- Wilton and Northern Railway

==== Nevada ====
- Carson and Tahoe Lumber and Fluming Company

==== New England ====
Railway name	Route	Track gauge mm	Length km	From	To	Operated by	Remarks
Maine
Bald Mountain Railroad	Jackman	1435		1915	1926		dismantled
Calais Railway	Calais - Woodland	1435	33	1835		Pan Am Railways	freight only
Carry Pond and Carry Brook Railroad	Moosehead Lake - Seboomook Lake	610	3	1914	1916		horse-drawn flat cars; dismantled
Eagle Lake and West Branch Railroad	Eagle Lake - Umbazooksus Lake	1435	21	1927	1933		transferred log drive pulpwood between river basins; dismantled
Franklin and Megantic Railway	Strong - Bigelow	610	48	1884	1935	Sandy River and Rangeley Lakes Railroad	dismantled
Phillips and Rangeley Railroad	Phillips - Rangeley	610	46	1890	1932	Sandy River and Rangeley Lakes Railroad	Victorian resort passenger service; dismantled
Ray Lumber Company	Bowerbank Township	1435		1912	1929		dismantled
Rumford Falls and Rangeley Lakes Railroad	Rumford - Kennebago	1435	75	1894	1936	Maine Central Railroad	dismantled
Seboomook Lake and Saint John Railroad	Seboomook Lake - Baker Branch Saint John River	1435	29	1919	1929		dismantled
Somerset Railroad	Bingham - Moosehead Lake	1435	81	1890	1933	Maine Central Railroad	Victorian resort passenger service; dismantled
Wild River Railroad	Gilead - Hastings	1435	16	1891	1904		dismantled
New Hampshire
Saco Valley Railroad	Mount Carrigain	1435	11	1892	1898		dismantled
Sawyer River Railroad	Sawyer River	1435	14	1877	1927		dismantled
Success Pond Railroad	Berlin - Success	1435	42	1893	1906		dismantled

==== New Mexico ====
- Alamogordo and Sacramento Mountain Railway

==== Oregon ====
- Oregon, California and Eastern Railway
- Oregon, Pacific and Eastern Railway
- Sumpter Valley Railroad

==== South Carolina ====
- Argent Lumber Company

==== West Virginia ====
- Cass Scenic Railroad State Park

==== Washington ====
- Chehalis Western Railroad
- Mosquito and Coal Creek Railroad
- Siler Logging Railroad
- White River Lumber Company Railway

== Forest railways in Asia ==
=== Indonesia ===
- Cepu Forest Railway

=== Japan ===
- Oigawa Railway Ikawa Line, regauged for passenger service
- Anbō (Yakushima) Forest Railway
- Kiso Forest Railway, demolished but later restored as the Akasawa Forest Railway, open seasonally
- Yanase Forest Railway, preserved in working order at Yanase Maruyama Park, and the nearby Umaji Onsen Umaji Forest Railway, operating on weekends

=== Taiwan ===
- Alishan Forest Railway

== Forest railways in Oceania ==
=== Australia ===
- Powelltown Tramway, Victoria
- Tyers Valley Tramway, Victoria
- Timber railway lines of Western Australia

=== New Zealand ===
- Ellis and Burnand Tramway, Ongarue
- Brownlee Tramway, in operation from c.1881 through to 1915

== Other railways for the transport of goods ==
- Field railways (see: Feldbahn) for the transportation of rural produce; also originally for military use as well
- Harbour or port railways for loading and unloading goods within a port
- Industrial railways for transporting goods from factories
- Hallig railways for transporting coastal defence materiel.
- Bush tramways in New Zealand, see West coast trams in New Zealand
- Light railway
- Military railways (see also: Heeresfeldbahn) for transporting military supplies and troops
- Mining railways for ore transportation
- Tramway (industrial)
- Wagonway
- Rail transport

== Sources ==
- Manfred Hohn, Waldbahnen in Österreich, Verlag Slezak 1989, ISBN 3-85416-148-4
- L.Reiner/H.Beiler/R.Sliwinski, Die Spiegelauer Forest Railway, Ohetaler Verlag Riedlhütte 2005, ISBN 3-937067-14-0
- Friedemann Tischer, Die Muskauer Waldeisenbahn, Verlag Kenning, Nordhorn 2003, ISBN 3-933613-63-9
