= Mosquito and Coal Creek Railroad =

Logging railroad in Washington State

Coordinates: 46°12′00″N 123°01′00″W

Mosquito and Coal Creek logging railroad
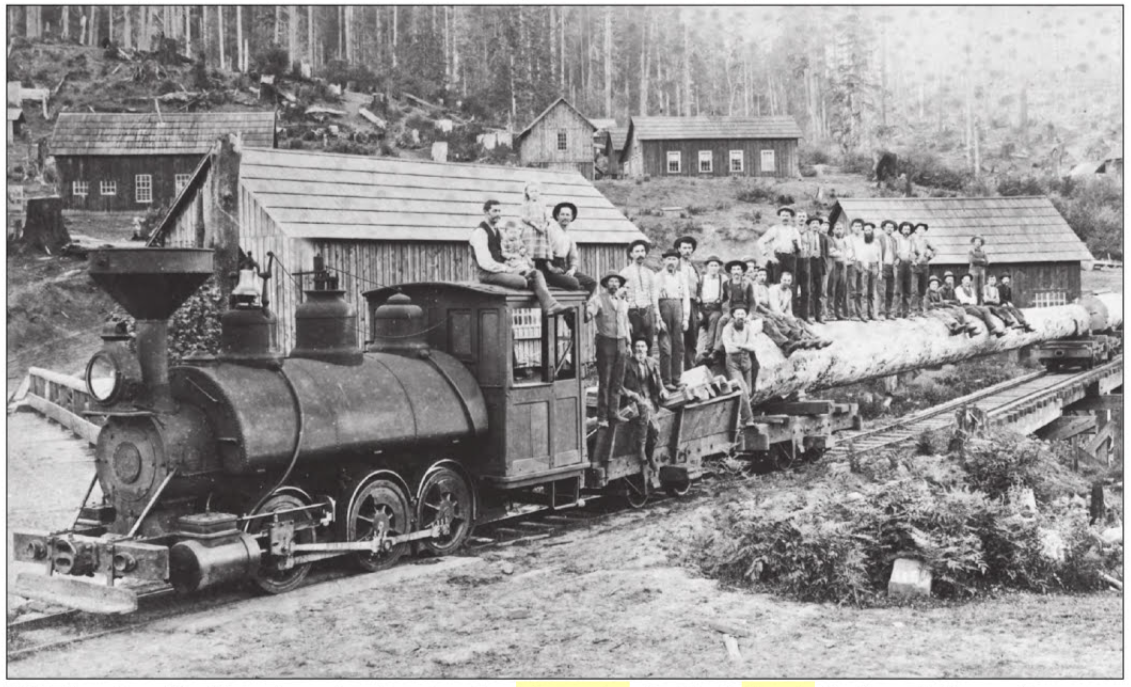

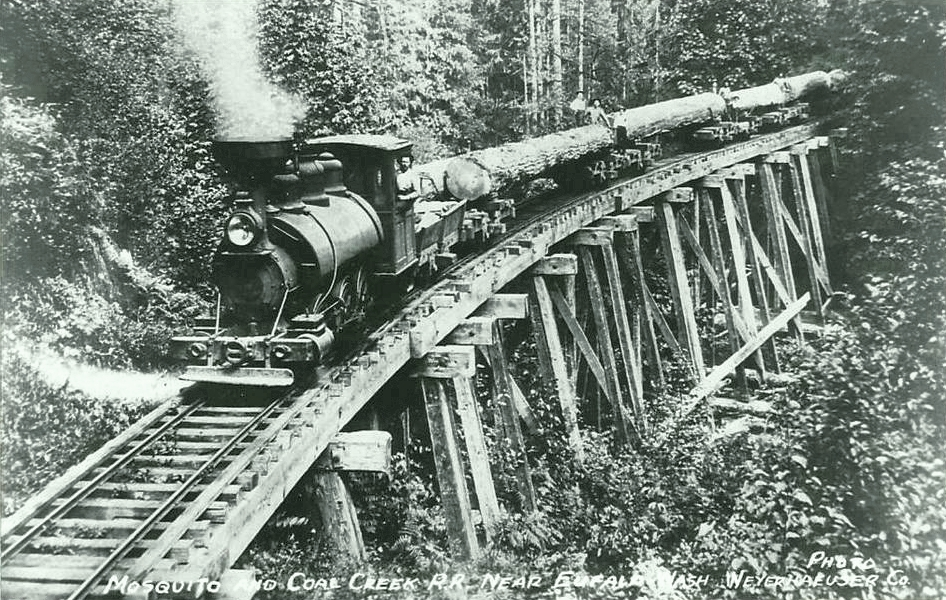
- Saddletank locomotive 'Rattler' on B.F. Brock's Mosquito & Coal Creek RR with log train on trestle

Overview
- Owner: B.F. Brock (1883-1904); Eastern & Western Lumber Co (1904-1926)
- Termini: Eufaula Heights; Coal Creek Slough

History
- Opened: 1883
- Closed: 1926

Technical
- Line length: 10 miles (16 kilometres)
- Track gauge: 3 ft (914 mm)

The Mosquito and Coal Creek logging railroad was a 10 miles (16 kilometres) long private logging railway with a gauge of 3 foot (914 mm) near Eufaula, Washington.

== History ==
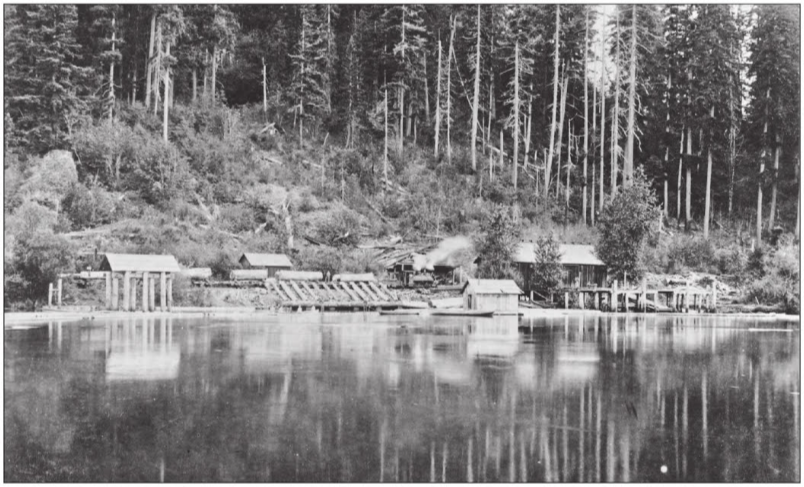
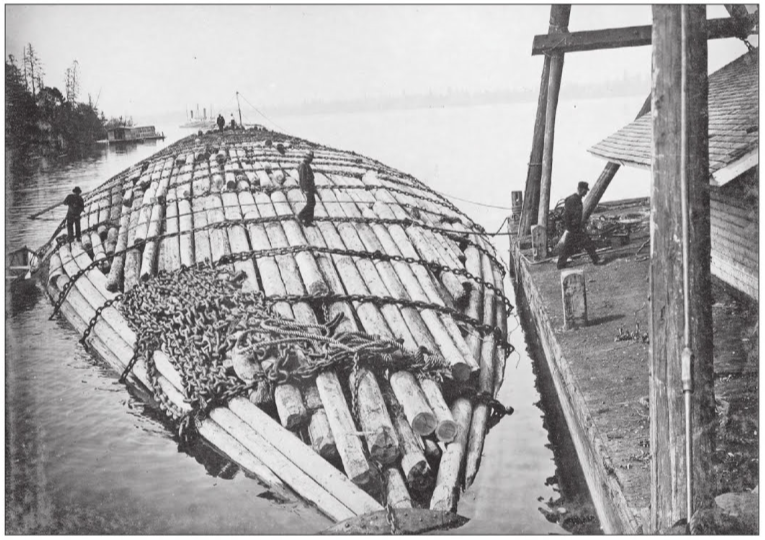
At Coal Creek Slough, where the logs were dumped into the Columbia River and towed as seaworthy 'cigar rafts' to the Californian market

=== Construction ===
Grading of the track with a maximum grade of 5% began on 2 January 1883 and the first rails with a weight of 56 lbs/yard (17.5 kg/m) were laid in the same year. The first train operated on 13 October 1883.

=== Operation ===
B.F. Brock operated his narrow gauge logging railway in Coal Creek near Eufaula from 1883 to 30 June 1904, when it was absorbed by the Eastern and Western Lumber Company. It ran from the logging camp on Eufaula Heights downhill to Coal Creek Slough, where the logs were dumped into the river. In 1896 it was listed as having 3.2 miles of line, in 1901 it had 8 miles and finally in 1903 even 10 miles (5.1 km, 12.9 km and 16.1 km).

=== Takeover ===
The company was renamed Eastern & Western Lumber Company on 1 July 1904. It leased the railway to the independent Eufaula Co. The network was extended to 11 miles (18 km) by 30 June 1910, 12 miles (19 km) by 30 June 1911 and to 15 miles (24 km) by 1923. At one point in history, Mosquito Creek was renamed Harmony Creek.

=== Closure ===
The Eastern and Western Lumber Company went out of business 1926.

== Rolling stock ==
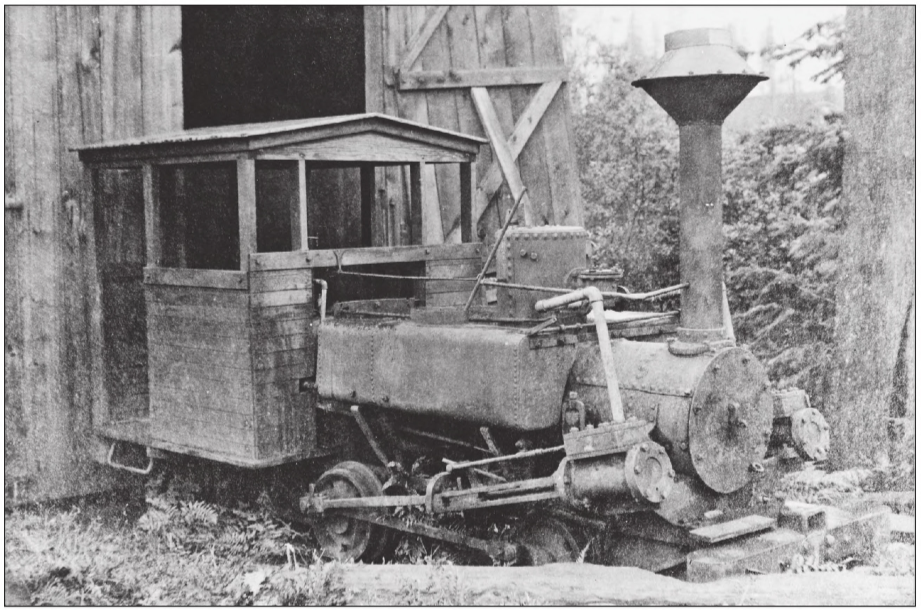
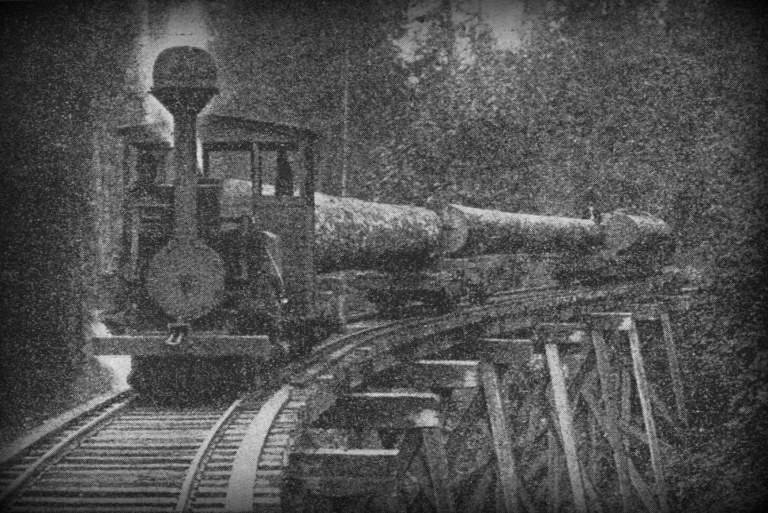
'The Ant,' the first locomotive built on the Pacific Coast shown on Mosquito and Coal Creek logging railroad

The Ant was an 0-4-0T steam locomotive made by Fulton Iron Works in September 1871. It had 6 by 12 inches (150 by 300 mm) cylinders and a weight of 7 tons, running on a 3-foot 6 gauge. It was first used as Seattle & Walla Walla Railroad #5 (Feb 1878), then as the first Columbia and Puget Sound Railroad #5 (Nov 1880). Then it was sold to Ordway & Weidler Oak Point, Washington (May 1883) before it came to B. F. Brock (Mosquito & Coal Creek RR) at a price of $2000 near Stella, Washington (Oct 1883). It retired in 1890 and was displayed by W. H. Williamson at Stella in 1903. It was then acquired by Long-Bell Lbr. Co. Longview, WA (1923) and donated to the Longview, Portland and Northern Railway (1924) before it came to the City of Longview, Washington, where it was displayed and shown on parades. From there it was stolen and finally scrapped in 1937.

The second steam engine was a larger 0-6-0ST, which had been built by Baldwin Locomotive Works in 1890 with a weight of 28,000 lbs (12.8 tonnes).

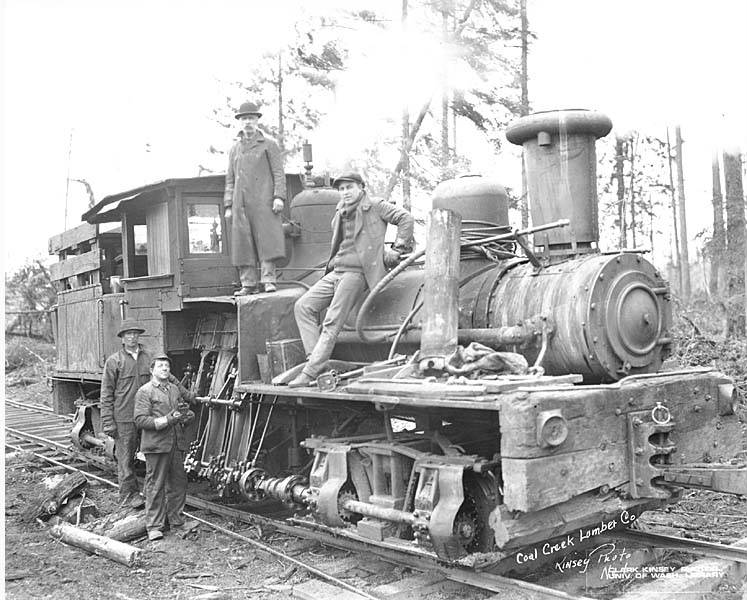
Coal Creek Lumber Company two-truck Shay locomotive, ca 1921

In 1901 the B. F. Brock Logging Company acquired a new two-truck Climax locomotive with builder's No 272 of 1901. It had a weight of 60 t and drivers with a diameter of 29 inches (740 mm). Further locomotives were acquired after the takeover.

By 30 June 1910 the Eastern & Western Lumber Company had a rolling stock of three Geared steam locomotives, two rod engines, 40 logging trucks, nine flat cars.
