= Powelltown =

- Town
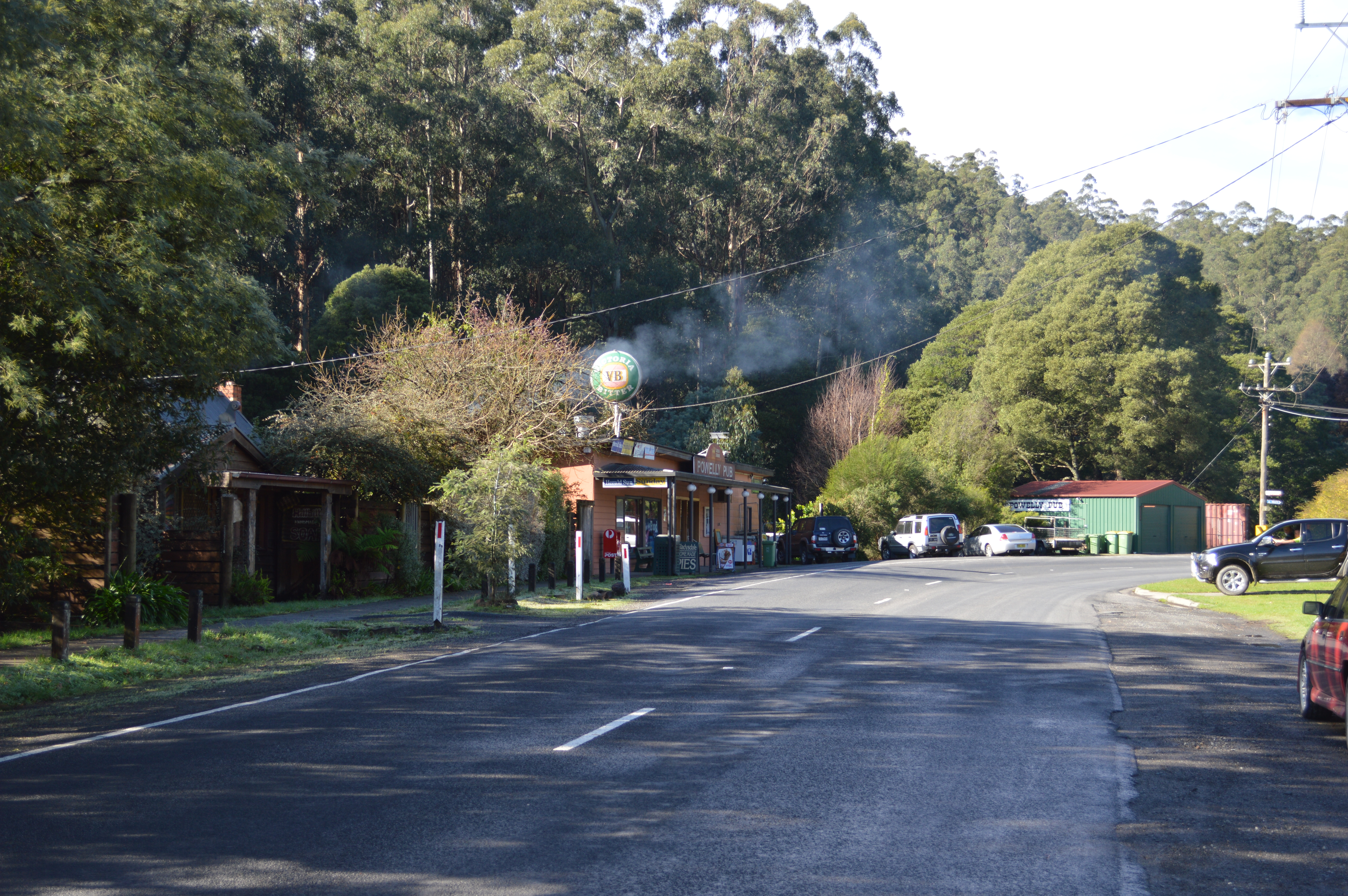
- Main street

- Interactive map of Powelltown
- Coordinates: 37.865°S 145.753°E
- Country: Australia
- State: Victoria
- LGA: Shire of Yarra Ranges
- Location: 70 km (43 mi) from Melbourne; 25 km (16 mi) from Warburton

Government
  - State electorate: Electoral district of Eildon
  - Federal division: Division of Casey
- Elevation: 189 m (620 ft)

Population
  - Total: 214 (2021 census)
- Postcode: 3797
- Mean max temp: 18.3 °C (64.9 °F)
- Mean min temp: 6.9 °C (44.4 °F)
- Annual rainfall: 1,458.6 mm (57.43 in)

Powelltown is a town in Victoria, Australia, 70 kilometres (43 mi) east of Melbourne's central business district, located within the Shire of Yarra Ranges local government area. Powelltown recorded a population of 214 at the 2021 census.

== History ==
The first settlement was established in 1901 when H. Blake founded the first timber mill known as Blake's Mill; later a larger mill was constructed and completed in 1913 by the Victorian Powell Wood Processing Company to harvest hardwood mountain ash in the Little Yarra Valley to fill its new government contracts. The logs were transported from the forests to the sawmills by tramway and from there to the railheads at Yarra Junction and Warburton. Renowned axemen like Shane Corr opened up the veins of timber with no more than an axe and a team of bullocks to fulfil his government contracts.

The Post Office opened around 1904, as Blake's, and the settlement was renamed Powelltown in 1912. The Upper Yarra Shire Council agreed to the name change after an application by the Victorian Powell Wood Process Limited; the name taken from 'powellising', a method of boiling timber in a solution of molasses and arsenic, which later stops fungal growths and dry rot.

The Powelltown Tramway provided a passenger and goods service to Yarra Junction between 1913 and 1945.

The last function of the first Australian Scout Jamboree in December 1934–January 1935 was an extensive program of hikes, organised by Rover Scouts, to Gilwell Park in Gembrook; Powelltown being the headquarters and starting point. (Despite the marketing opportunity of name similarity, Lord Baden-Powell did not visit Powelltown.)

Today, many of the trails constructed to transport timber have been opened up as walking trails and driving routes for tourists, including the Powelltown Tramway Rail Trail.

== Sport ==
The town has an Australian Rules football team competing in the Yarra Valley Mountain District Football League. Despite its small population, Powelltown has produced a number of AFL former players including, Melbourne Demons forward Sean Charles and Western Bulldogs and Fremantle forward Daniel Hargraves. A relative of Charles, former West Coast Eagles defender David Wirrpanda also played junior football with the Powelltown Demons.

The town also has a cricket club that plays in the Ringwood and District Cricket Association. It features two senior teams that compete in the D. J. Strachan Shield and the Adrian Hammond Shield.
