= Tsugaru =

Tsugaru (津軽) may refer to:

- Folklore of the Tsugaru region
- Tsugaru, Aomori, a city of Aomori Prefecture, Japan
- Tsugaru Peninsula
- Tsugaru Strait, between Honshū and Hokkaidō
  - Tsugaru Kaikyō Ferry, a ferry crossing this strait
- Tsugaru-jamisen, a traditional style of shamisen playing associated with the area
- Tsugaru dialect, a dialect of Japanese spoken in this area
- Tsugaru clan, a daimyō clan
- Tsugaru Forest Railway, forest railway in Tsugaru region
- Tsugaru (novel), by Osamu Dazai
- Tsugaru Expressway, an expressway in Aomori Prefecture, Japan
- Tsugaru (train), a train service in Japan
- Japanese cruiser Tsugaru (formerly the Imperial Russian Pallada), a warship in the Imperial Japanese Navy
- Japanese minelayer Tsugaru, a minelayer that took part in the Pacific War
- "Tsugaru", a song from the Dance Dance Revolution series
- Tsugaru Mine, an extensive coal mine in Kobyaysky Ulus, Sakha Republic, Siberia
- Tsugaru (apple), a variety of Japanese apple
