= Eufaula =

Eufaula may refer to:

== Places in the United States ==
Cities

- Eufaula, Alabama
- Eufaula, Oklahoma
- Eufaula, Washington

Lakes

- Eufaula Lake, Oklahoma
- Walter F. George Lake, Alabama–Georgia; commonly known as Lake Eufaula

== Other uses ==
- Eufaula (album), an album by the Atlanta Rhythm Section
- Eufaula (YTB-800), a United States Navy Natick-class large harbor tug named for the Alabama city
- Eufaula people, an indigenous people in Georgia, United States

== See also ==
- Eufala, Florida
