= Zelennikovskaya narrow-gauge railway =

Railway in Arkhangelsk Oblast, Russia

Coordinates: 62.34421°N 44.67170°E

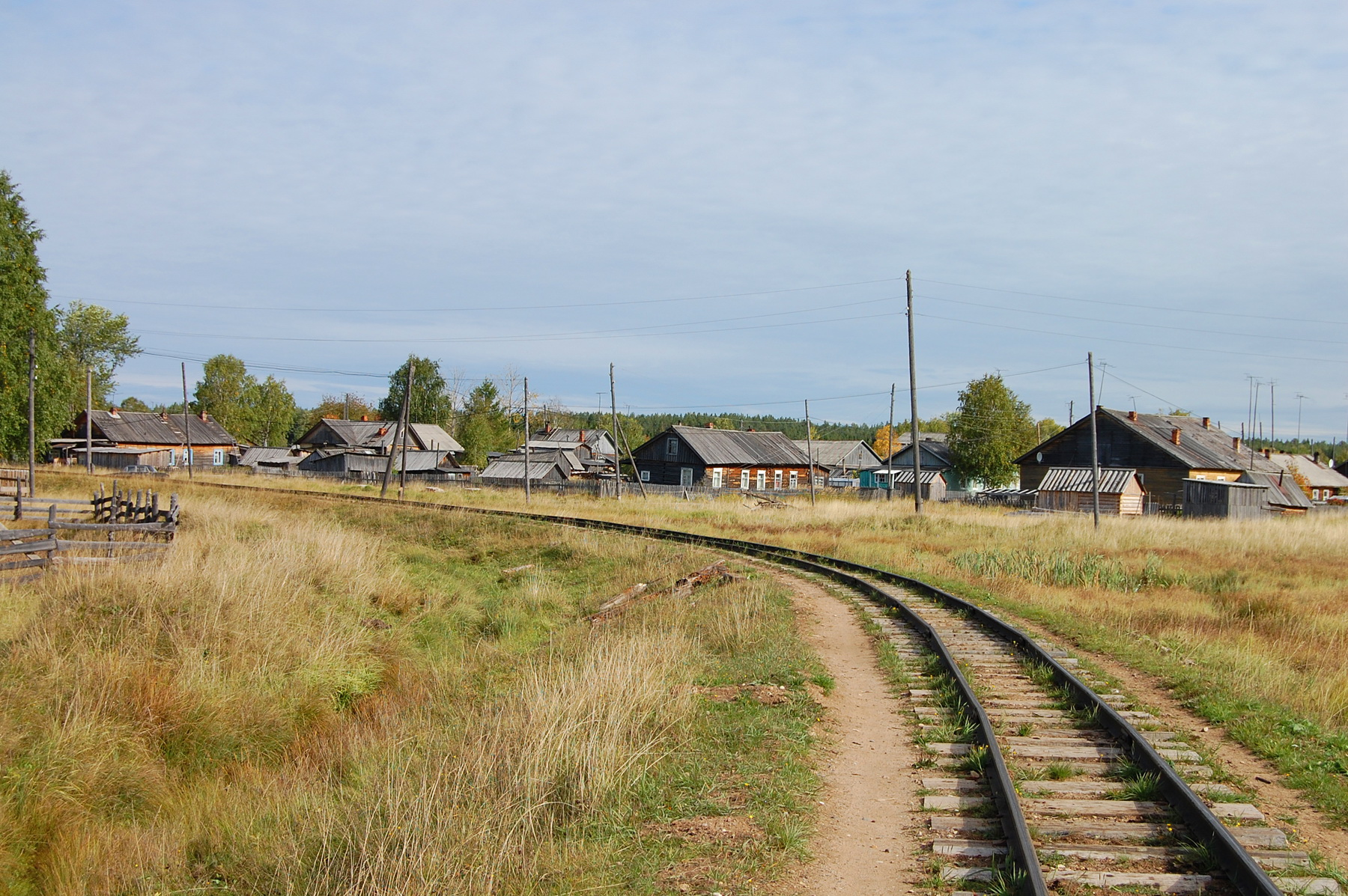

Overview
- Locale: Arkhangelsk Oblast, Russia
- Termini: Zelennik
- Website: www.ilimgroup.com

Service
- Type: Narrow-gauge railway
- Operator: OJSC Ilim Group

History
- Opened: 1949

Technical
- Line length: 57 kilometres (35 mi)
- Track gauge: 750 mm (2 ft 5 1/2 in)
Route map
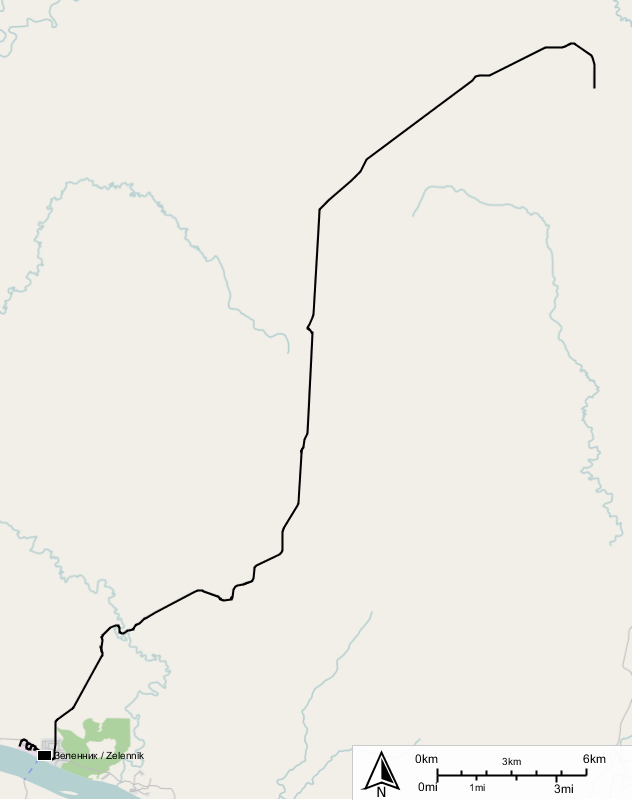

The Zelennikovskaya narrow-gauge railway is located in Arkhangelsk Oblast, Russia. The forest railway was opened in 1949, and has a total length of 57 kilometres (35 mi) is currently operational, the track gauge is 750 mm (2 ft 5 1/2 in).

== Current status ==
The Zelennikovskaya forestry railway's first narrow-gauge line emerged in 1949, in the area of Verkhnetoyemsky District, Arkhangelsk Oblast from the village Zelennik. The total length of the Zelennikovskaya railway at the peak of its development exceeded 84 kilometres (52 mi), of which 57 kilometres (35 mi) are currently operational. The railway operates scheduled freight services from Zelennik, used for forestry tasks for transportation of felled logs and forestry workers and operates year-round.

== Rolling stock ==
=== Locomotives ===
- TU6A – No. 0726 (snowplow), 3459, 2061, 3080
- TU8 – No. 0333, 0191
- TU4 – No. 2663
- TD-5U "Pioneer"

=== Railroad cars ===
- Boxcar
- Tank car
- Snowplow
- Dining car
- Crane LT-110
- Passenger car
- Railway log-car and flatcar
- Hopper car to transport track ballast

== Gallery ==
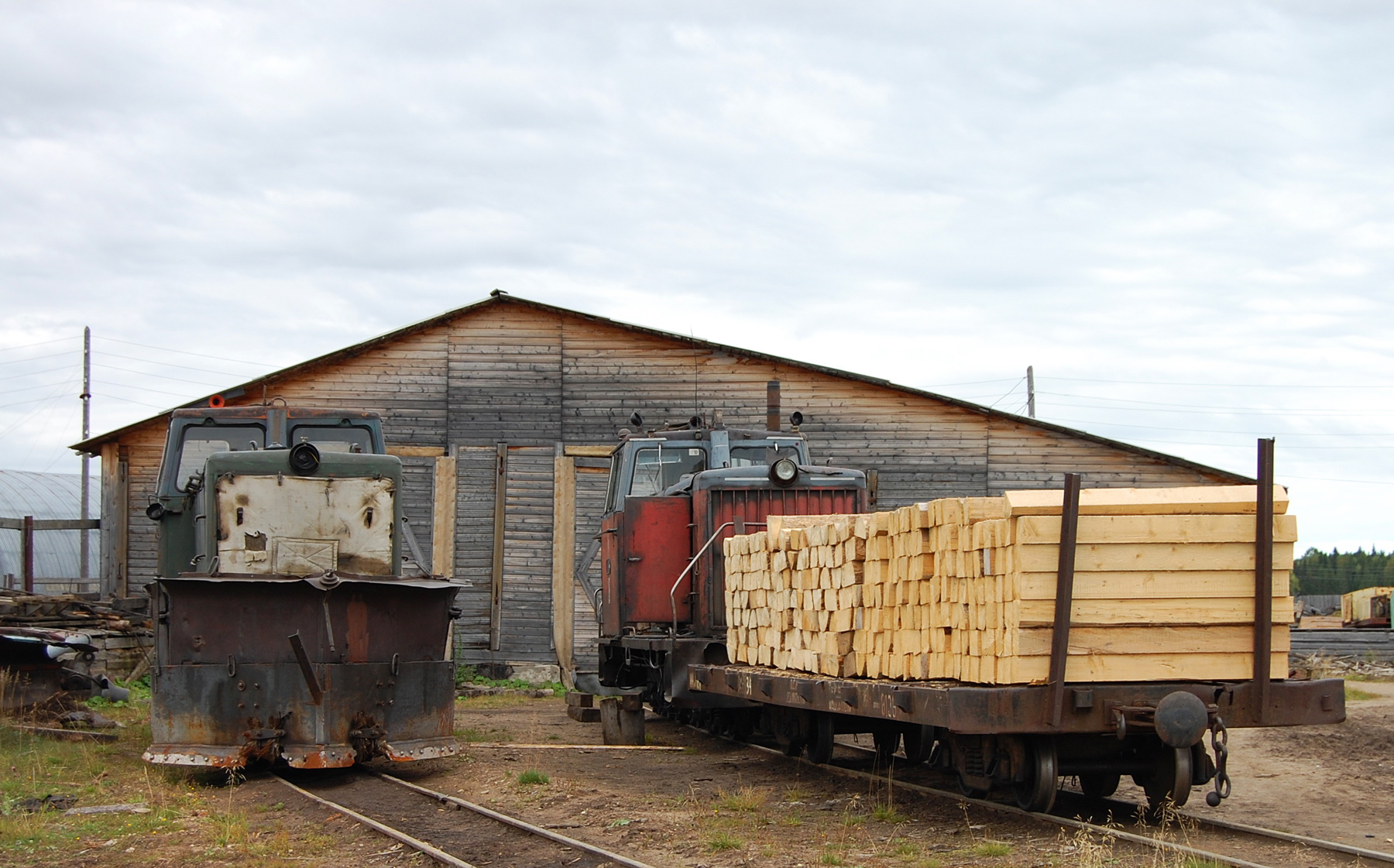
Locomotives TU6A – № 0726 (Snowplow) and 3080

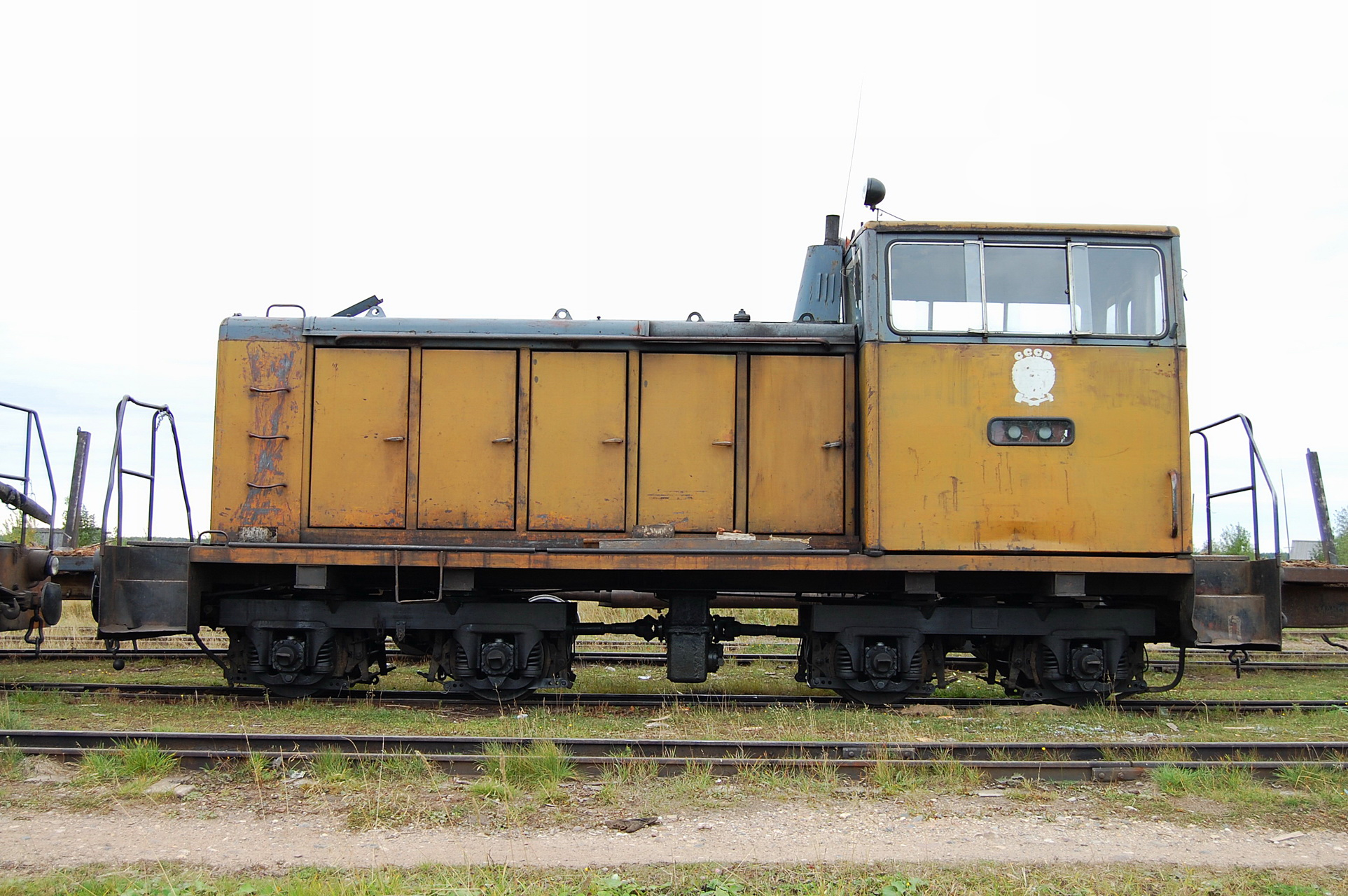
Locomotive TU6A - № 3459

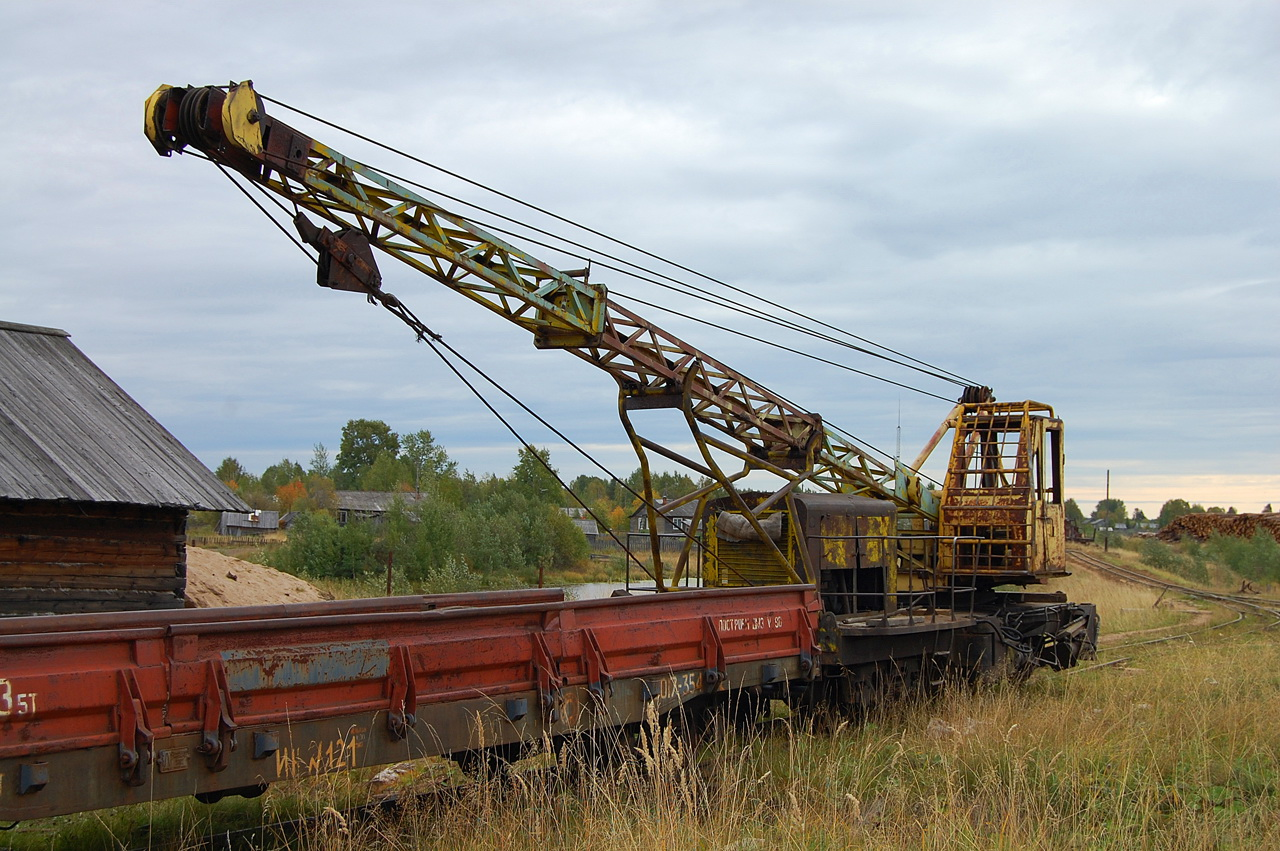
Crane LT-110

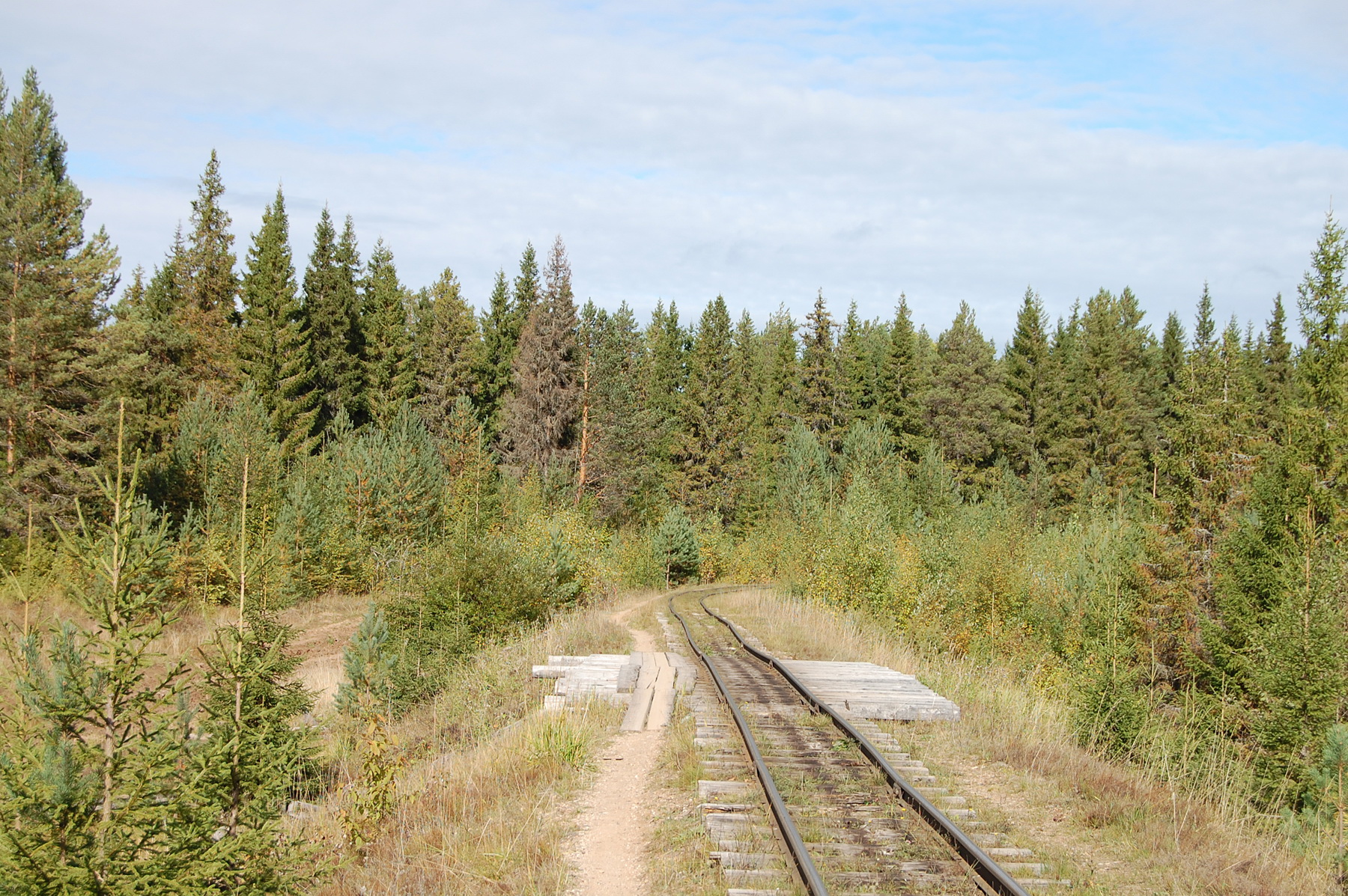
Zelennikovskaya forestry railway

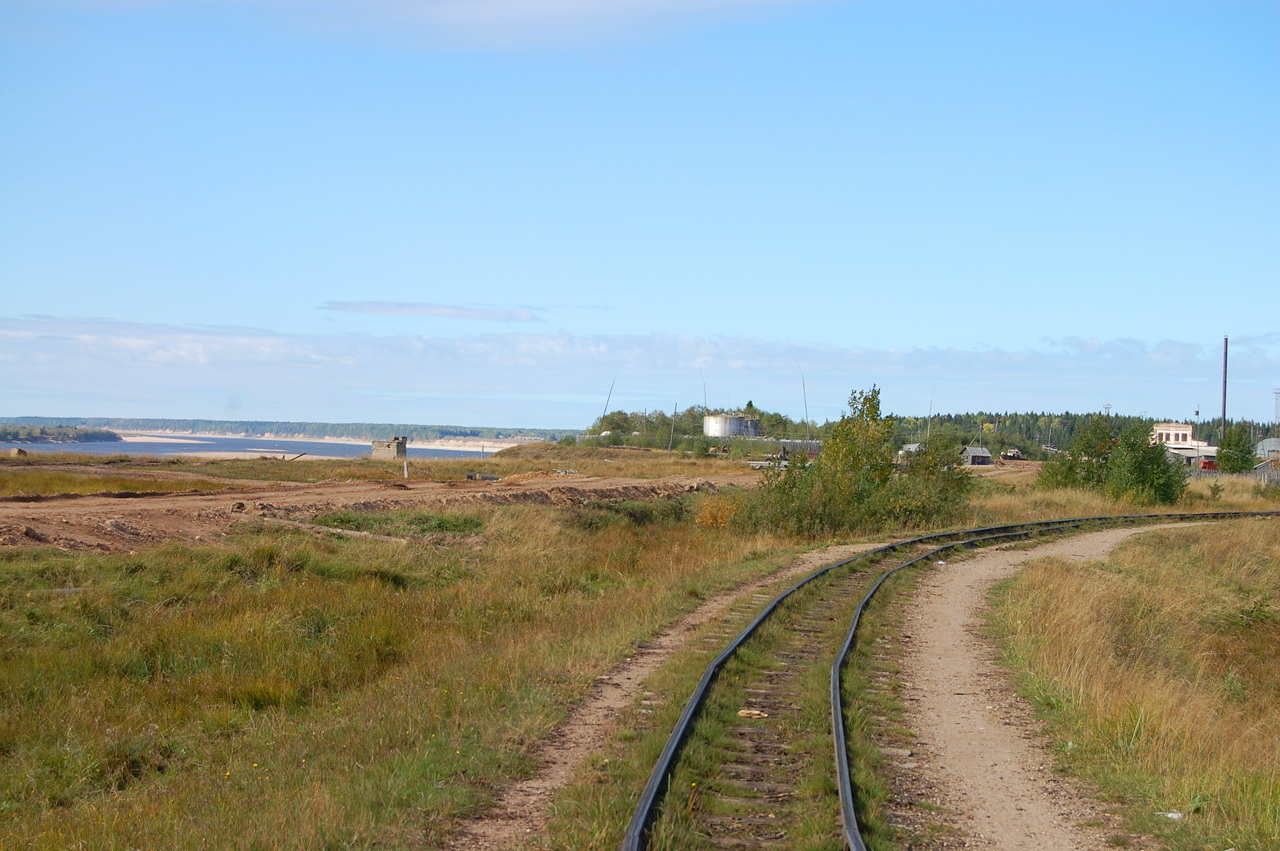
Zelennikovskaya forestry railway

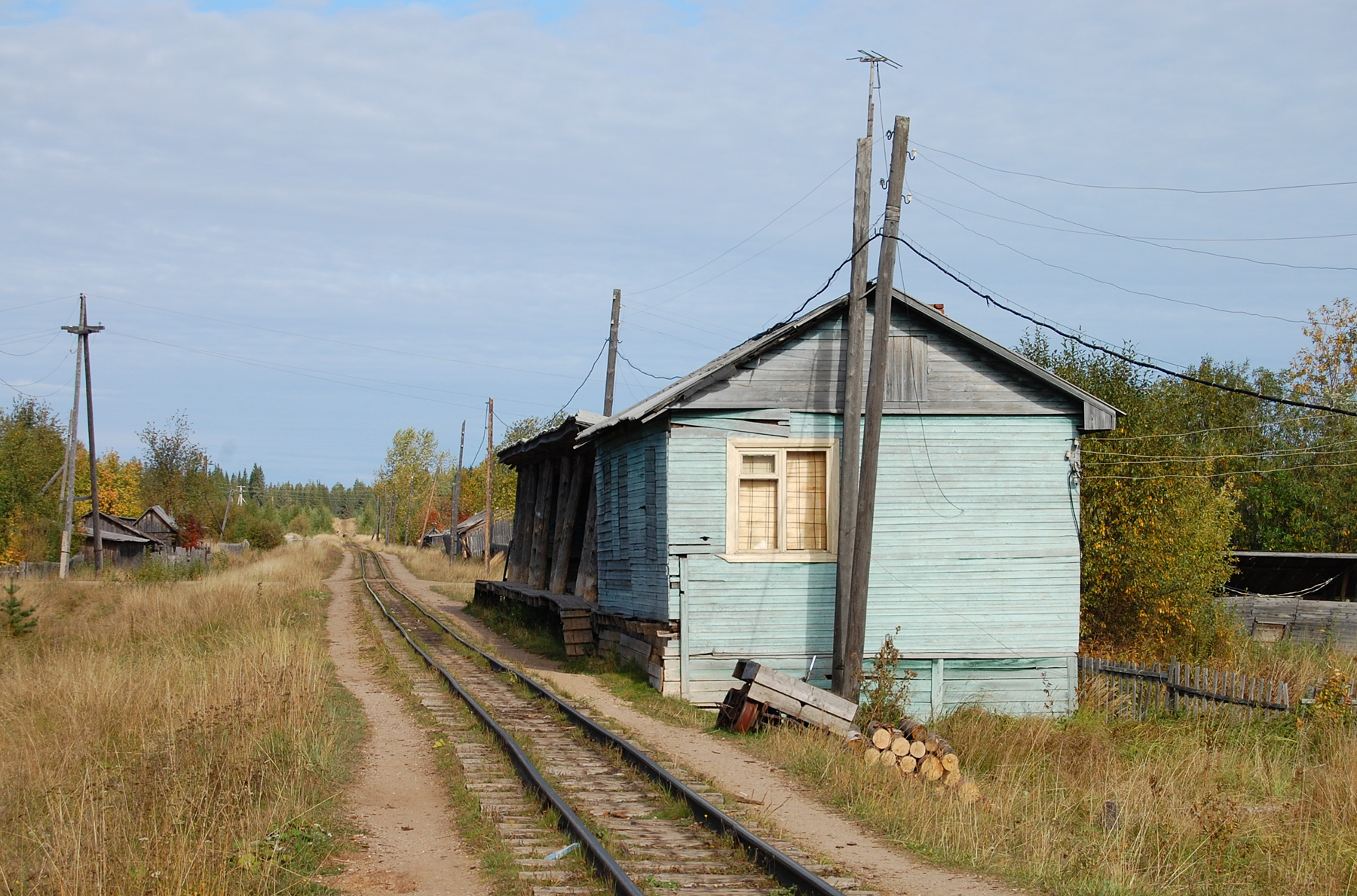
Zelennik Passenger Station

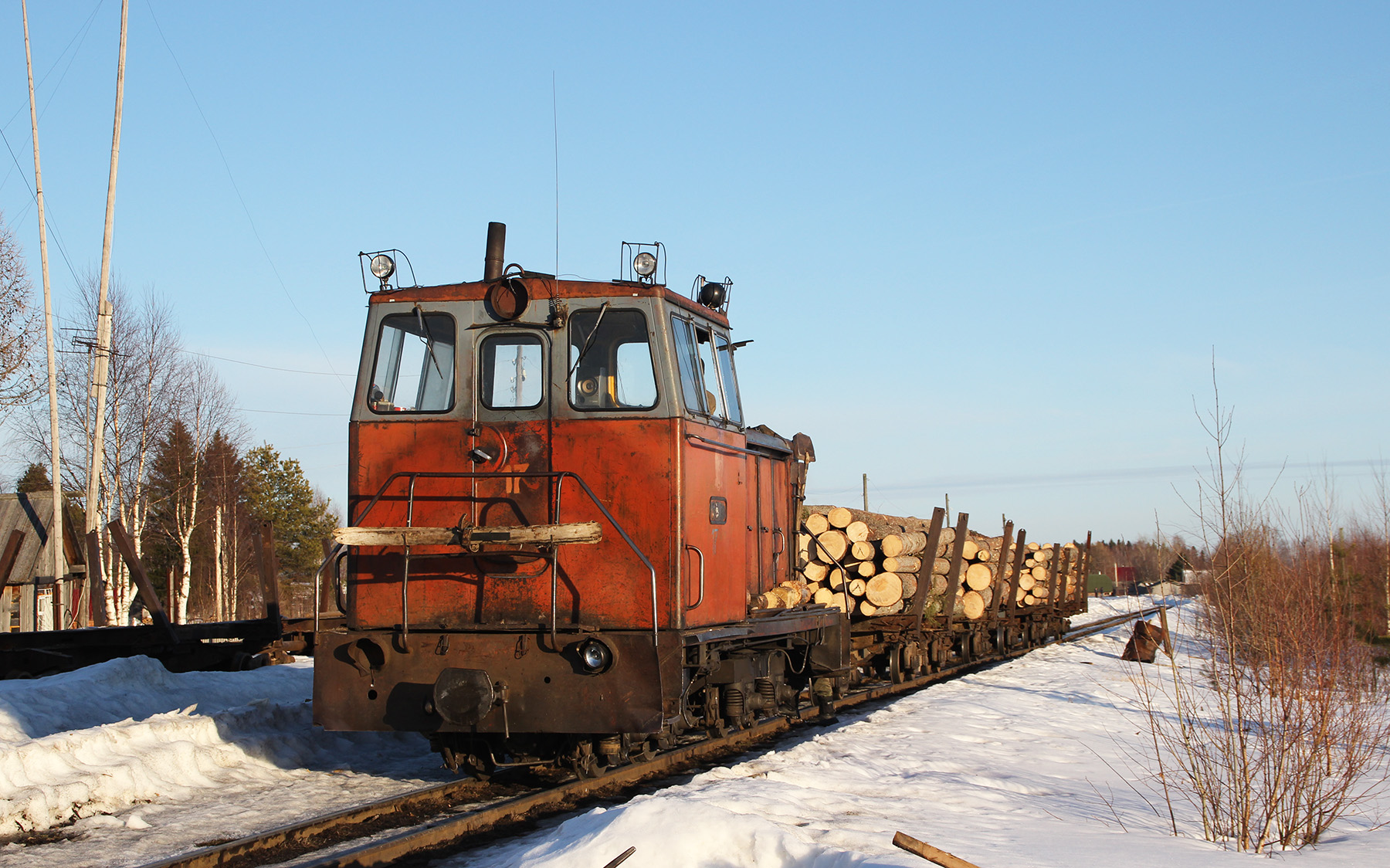
Locomotive TU6A with freight train, 2016

== See also ==
- Narrow-gauge railways in Russia
- List of Russian narrow-gauge railways rolling stock
