= Klammbachwaldbahn =

The Klammbachwaldbahn (Klammbach forest railway) was a 760 mm (2 ft 5 15/16 in) narrow-gauge forest railway serving the forestry industry in the forests northeast of Achenkirch in Austria. The railway was approximately six kilometres long and ran from Weitgries into the forest nearby. The railway also operated an incline to assist in moving forest products. The railway was built in the First World War by prisoners of war and operated to around 1960.
