= Tsugaru Forest Railway =

Former forest railway in Aomori Prefecture, Japan

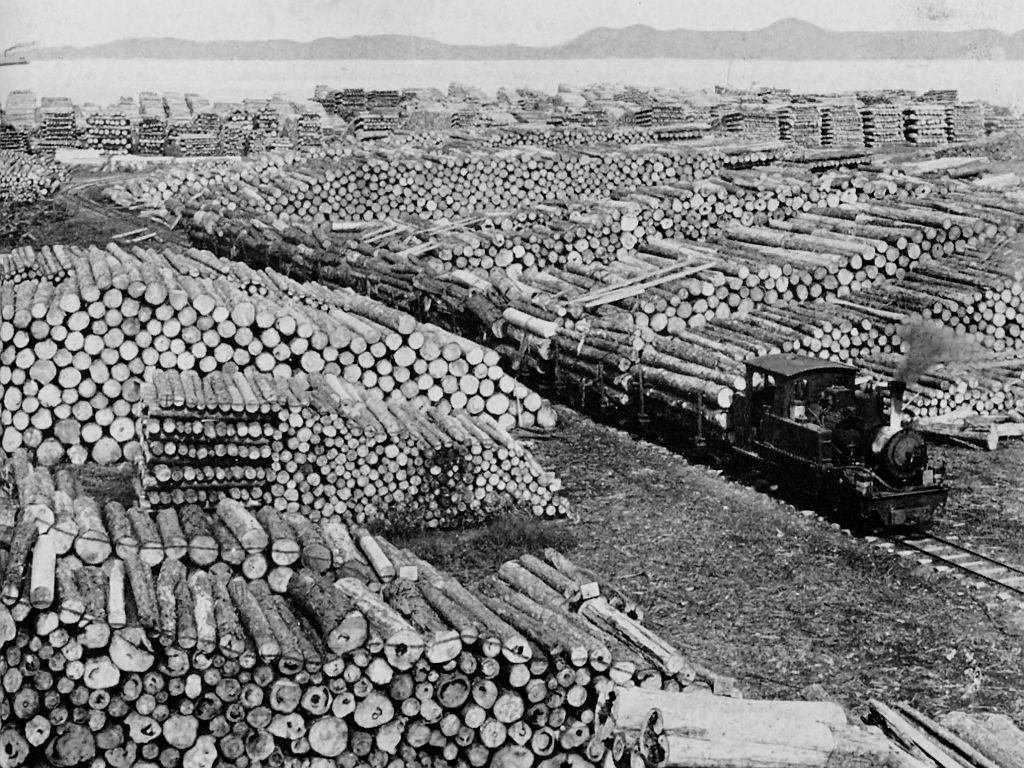
- Aomori Lumberyard, the starting point of the line

Overview
- Native name: 津軽森林鉄道
- Status: Defunct
- Locale: Aomori Prefecture, Japan

History
- Opened: July 1908
- Closed: 1967

Technical
- Track gauge: 762 mm (2 ft 6 in)

Tsugaru Forest Railway (Japanese: 津軽森林鉄道, Hepburn: Tsugaru-Shinrin-Tetsudo) was a forest railway located in Aomori Prefecture, Japan. The narrow-gauge railway was opened in July 1908 as the first state-owned forest railway in Japan, its network spanning 283 kilometers. It was abolished and abandoned in 1967 after trucks replaced the railway.

== History ==
After the Edo period, there were many cypress trees in the Tsugaru Peninsula as the Tsugaru Domain had banned deforestation in some areas, and some areas were not suited for transporting wood.

After the economic upturn caused by the Russo-Japanese War in 1903, the demand for wood had increased. The Japanese government put effort into the production of wooden material, one being the establishment of a sawmill nearby Aomori Station in 1906. In the Tsugaru Peninsula, wood logs were transported via rivers, a method only usable in the spring when melted snow flows into rivers. The forest railway was planned and built to ensure forestry can proceed all year.

The line was opened in July 1908 by the Japanese government to transport wood from state-owned forests. It was the first state-owned forest railway in Japan, with a track gauge of 762 mm. The first train ran in May 1910.

After the World War II, trucks began to replace cargo trains, leading to the line's closure in 1967. The remaining infrastructure of the line has been designated as a forestry heritage in 2017.

== See also ==
- Forestry in Japan
- Kiso Forest Railway — another Japanese forest railway
