= Reichraming =

- Municipality
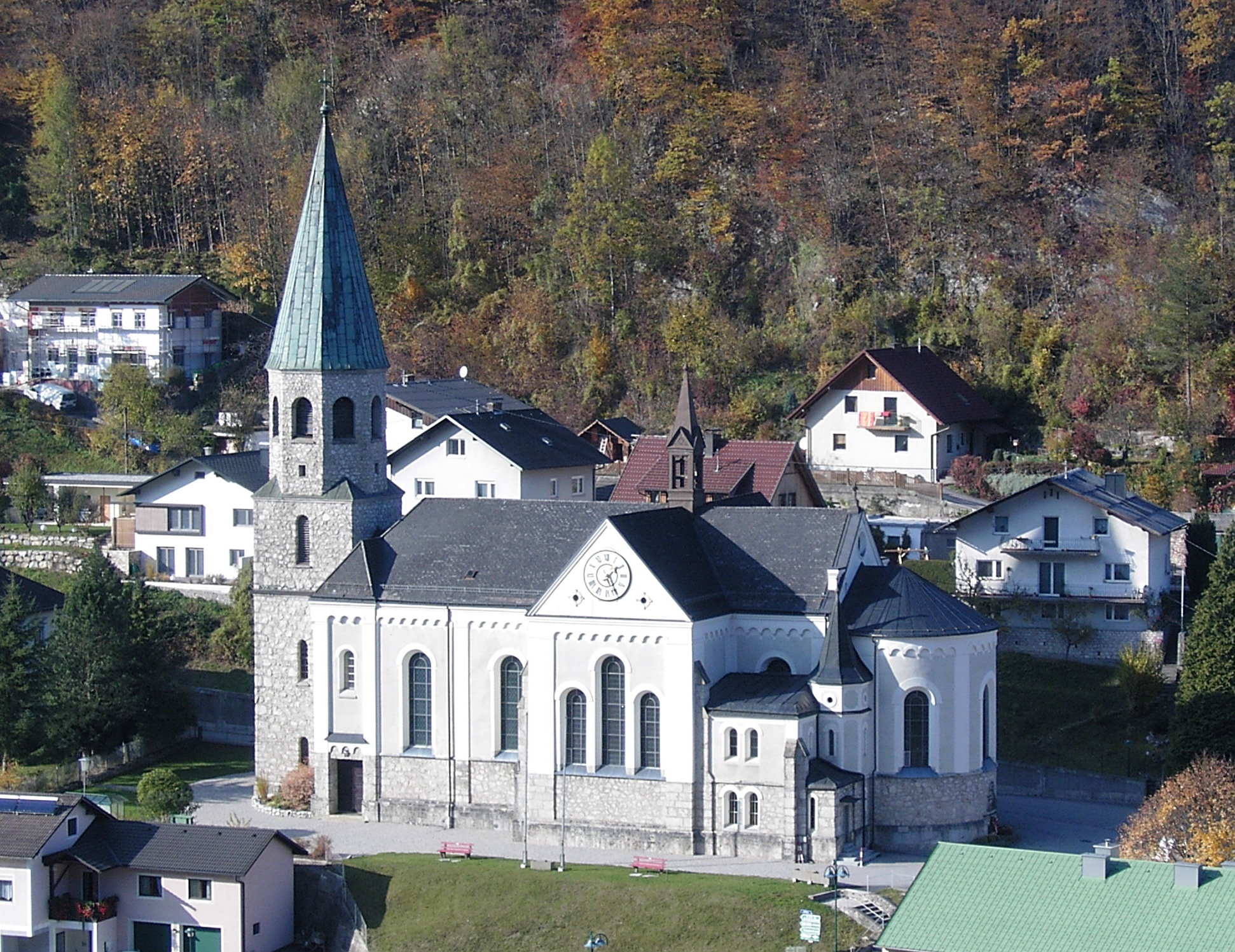

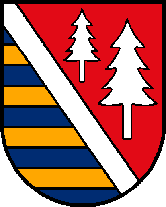
- Coat of arms

- Location within Austria
- Coordinates: 47°53′26″N 14°27′44″E
- Country: Austria
- State: Upper Austria
- District: Steyr-Land

Government
  - Mayor: Reinhold Haslinger (SPÖ)

Area
  - Total: 102.27 km^{2} (39.49 sq mi)
- Elevation: 356 m (1,168 ft)

Population (2018-01-01)
  - Total: 1,742
  - Density: 17.03/km^{2} (44.12/sq mi)
- Time zone: UTC+1 (CET)
  - Summer (DST): UTC+2 (CEST)
- Postal code: 4462
- Area code: 07255
- Vehicle registration: SE
- Website: www.reichraming.at

Reichraming is a municipality in the district of Steyr-Land in the Austrian state of Upper Austria.

== Geography ==
About 79 percent of the municipality is forest, and 12 percent is farmland.
