= Powelltown tramway =

Former tramway in Victoria, Australia

Coordinates: 37.832667°S 145.839770°E

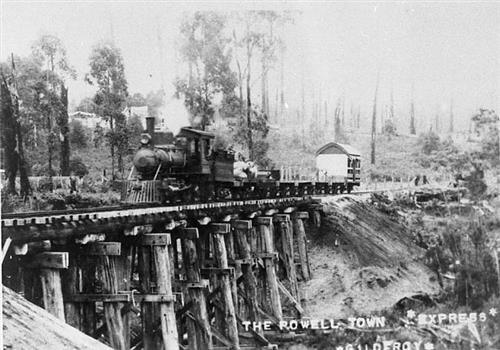
- Powelltown 'Express' at Gilderoy, 1914

Overview
- Dates of operation: 1913–1944

Technical
- Track gauge: 3 ft (914 mm)

Other

The Powelltown tramway was a 3 ft (914 mm) narrow gauge tramway that operated between Powelltown and Yarra Junction, Victoria, Australia, between 1913 and 1945.

The tramway was owned by the sawmill at Powelltown and its primary role was to move sawn timber from the mill to the main railway system. However, it also operated a timetabled passenger service, and carried goods as a common carrier. The tramway also operated a number of logging tramways into the forest east of Powelltown.

The right-of-way has been converted into the Powelltown Tramway Rail Trail. It is on private property and there is limited access to the line.

== Location ==
The 3 ft (914 mm) timber railway connected the 5 ft 3 in (1,600 mm) Victorian Railways at Yarra Junction. There was a sawmill in Powelltown, and the line ran from there to the forest areas further east. The track ran through a 313-metre (1,027 ft) tunnel, constructed in 1925, and over several large trestle bridges.

== History ==
=== Construction ===
The Powelltown tramway was built in 1912–13 by Victorian Powell Wood Process Ltd (VPWP). Although the forest railways to Beech Forest, Gembrook and Walhalla were built with a 762 mm (2 ft 6 in) gauge, existing horse-drawn railways with wooden rails in the Powelltown area used a 3 ft (914 mm) gauge, so the decision was made to conform with that, meaning that timber on long timber trucks could be transported without transhipment. The construction of the 3- and 5-ton trucks was similar to that of those in Western Australia which, however, had a track gauge of 1,067 mm (3 ft 6 in). Bridges over watercourses were almost identical to those seen in Western Australia.

=== Operation ===
Trains ran three times a day to transport long timber. To be on the safe side, the long timber trolleys were decoupled from the locomotive on the incline and they were retarded using brakes attached to the trolleys. The steam locomotive then followed at its maximum speed. Around 30 giant eucalyptus trees, containing around 30,000 super feet (70 cubic metres) of timber, were felled and sawn each day. There were also scheduled passenger services, using mixed passenger and freight trains.

=== Change of ownership ===
The Powell wood preservation process used by the VPWP was unsuccessful, so the company became insolvent in 1914. Its assets were taken over by the Victorian Hardwood Milling & Seasoning Company, which had far less capital than its predecessor.

=== Usage today ===
The right-of-way of the former tramway now forms a 45-km-long hiking trail, the Powelltown Tramway Rail Trail. It runs on private land, so access is limited to the path itself. It has been removed from the Victorian Heritage Register.

Two piles of sawdust, an old winch, and a steam boiler are all that is left to pinpoint the locations of the former bush mills along this section.

== Locomotives ==
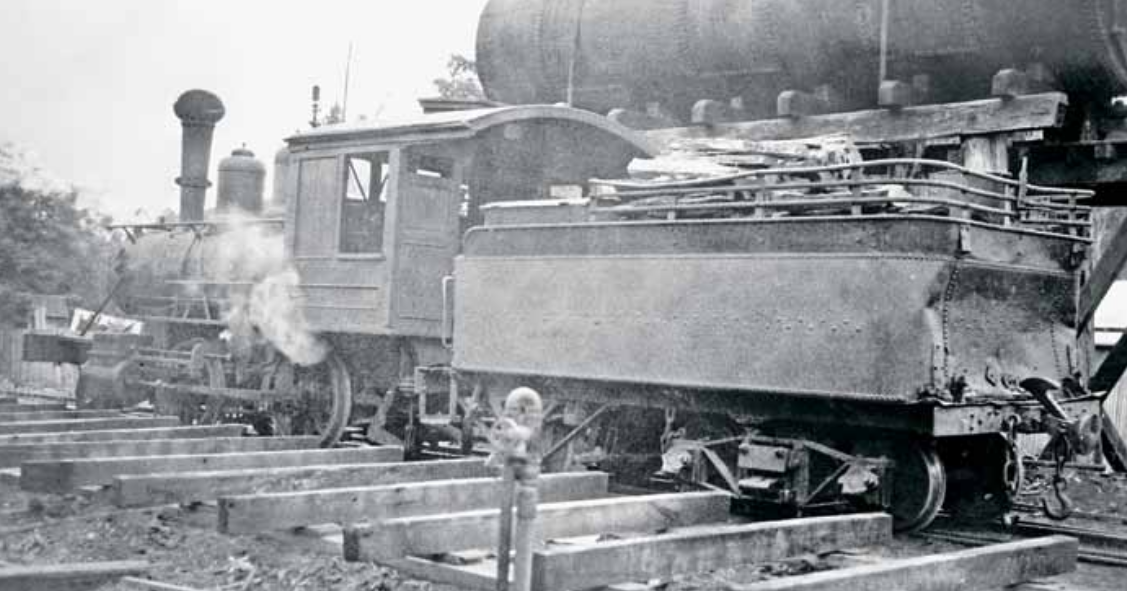
Little Yarra, the Baldwin No. 37718 from 1912, had a tender dented in a shunting accident and badly bent railings

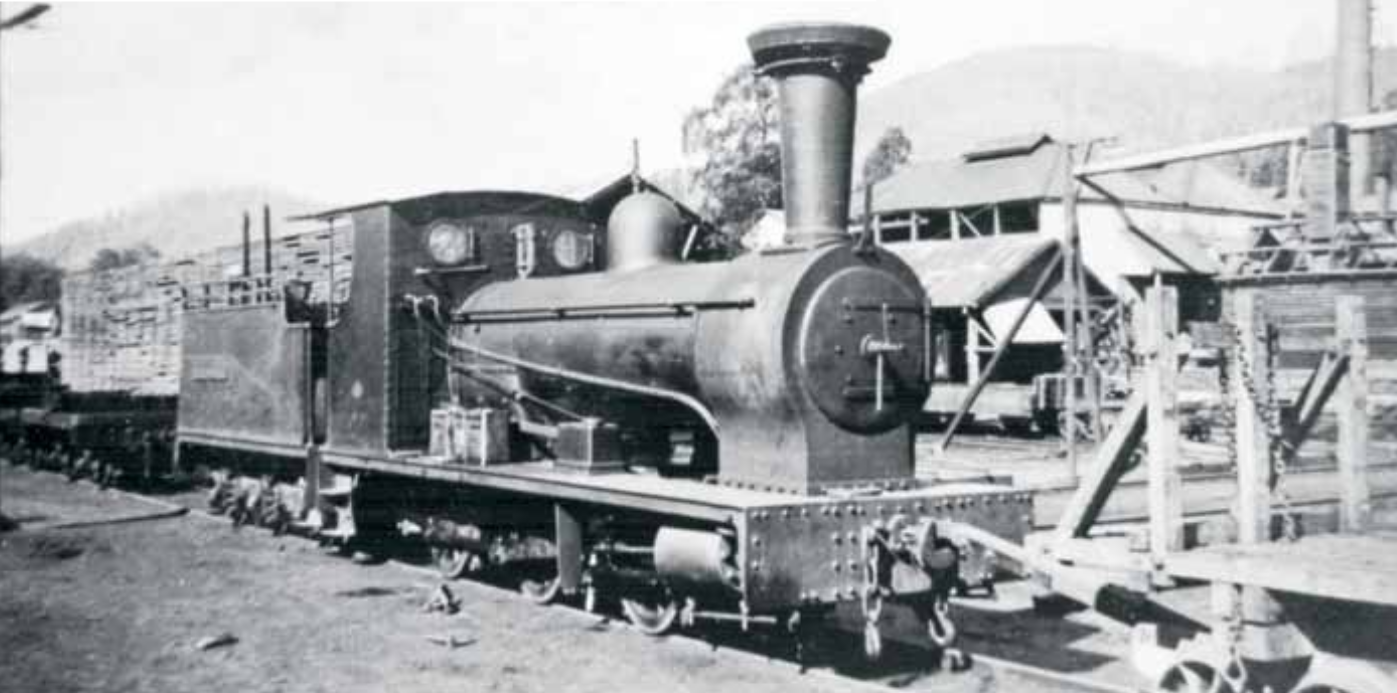
Powellite, the 1913 Bagnall No. 1965, had an oversized chimney with a Cheney spark extinguisher that was retrofitted during a major overhaul at the Victorian Railways Works in Newport in the late 1930s

The forest railway was initially operated with two brand-new steam locomotives specially built for it:

- Little Yarra, a Baldwin 2-4-0 locomotive (builder no. 37718 of 1912) was primarily intended for mixed passenger and freight traffic.
- Powellite, a Bagnall 0-6-0 locomotive (builder no. 1965 of 1913) was mainly used to transport sawn timber, but was also used to transport long timber in the bush. It was only delivered in 1914, and this delay in delivery may have been the reason why Squirt was procured.

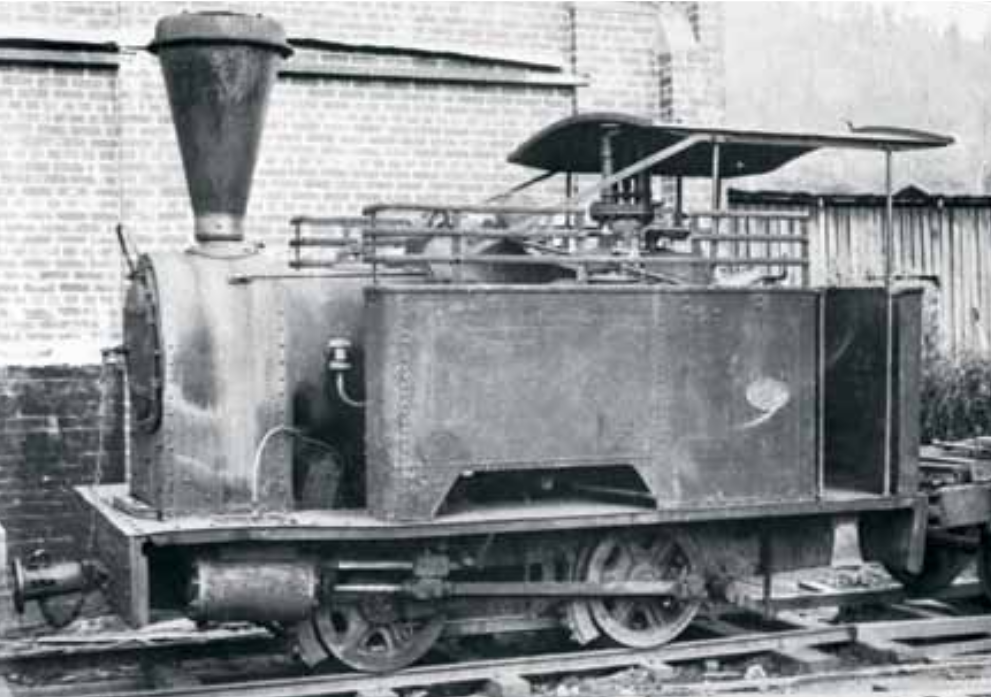
Coffee Pot, the Kerr Stuart No. 643 from 1898, was painted green and originally had white decorative lines on the water box

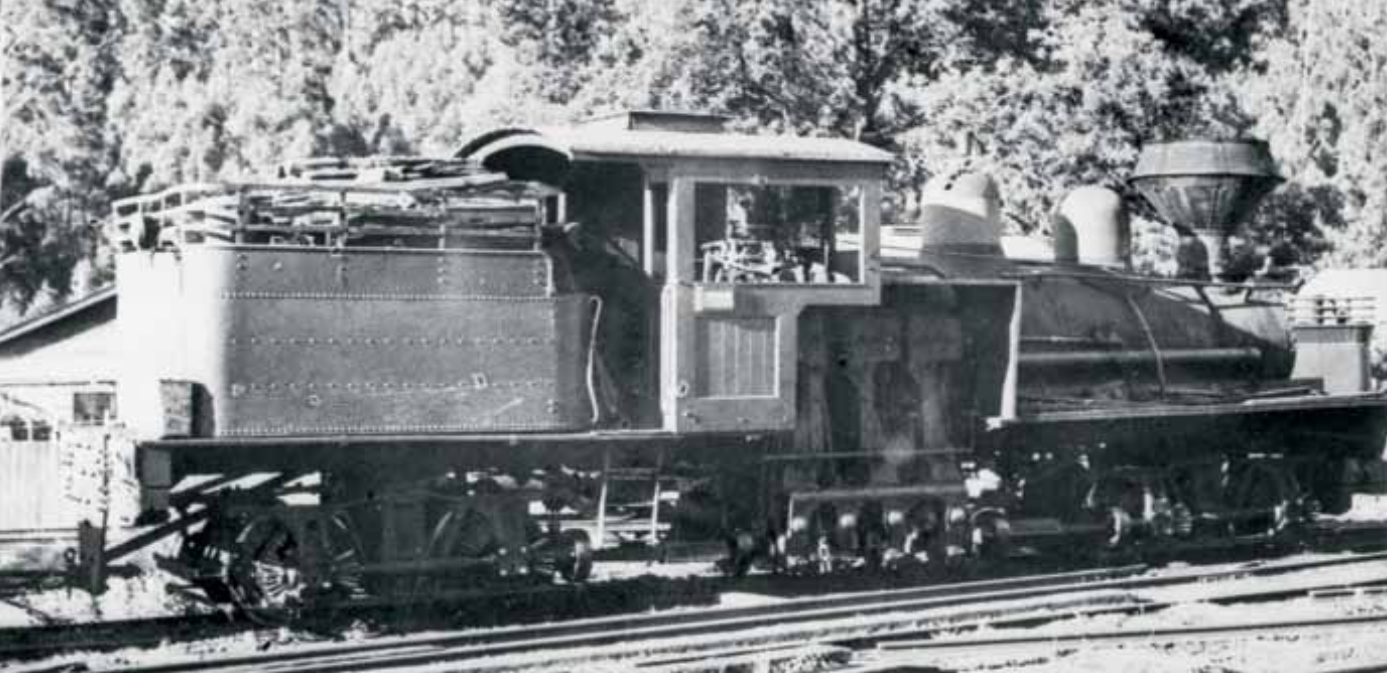
Shay geared locomotive, Lima factory no. 2575 or 2576 from 1912

They also purchased four-second-hand locomotive:

- Squirt, an Andrew Barclay and Sons 0-4-2ST locomotive (builder no. 311 of 1888), from the Warburton – Big Pats Creek Tramway. With it, the wooden bogies of the log trucks were pulled uphill into the cleared areas, which then rolled back to Powelltown into the valley after loading during a later trip, sometimes only driven by gravity.
- In April 1916, Coffee Pot, a Kerr Stuart 0-4-0T locomotive (builder no. 643 of 1898), from the Tasmanian Gold Mining Company in Beaconsfield, Tasmania.
- In 1919, a Lima 0-4-4-0TG Shay geared locomotive (builder no. 2575 from 1912), from the Abercrombie Copper Mines Limited in Burraga, New South Wales.
- In 1927, Green Beetle, another Lima 0-4-4-0TG Shay geared locomotive (builder no. 2576 from 1912), from the Hoskins Steel Works in Lithgow, New South Wales. It, like its identical sister locomotive 2575, was involved in a fire that destroyed all wooden parts and bent the frame. It was refurbished in the Powelltown workshops, with the damaged section cut out of the frame. As a result, it was a little shorter than before and offered less space in the driver's cab.

With the exception of Squirt, which was withdrawn from service and dismantled in the 1930s, all steam locomotives were used until the forest railway was closed in 1944. Only Powellite was later used on the Nauru narrow-gauge railway to transport phosphate.

=== Surviving ===
- Shay 2575—Scrapped 1947. The remains of the boiler still exist at Carpolac in Western Victoria, but in bad condition, some other parts may exist by lucky thieves from the 1960s.
- Shay 2576—Owned since mid-1960s by M. McEwen, who located the remains, frame, boiler, tank, cylinders and many other parts. No trucks survived. Currently located in Melbourne.
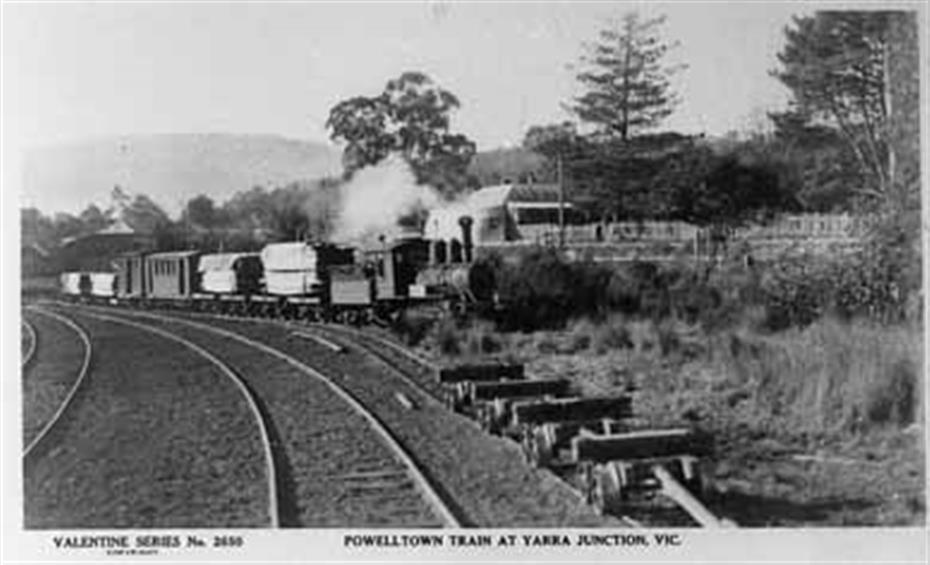
Train in Yarra Junction

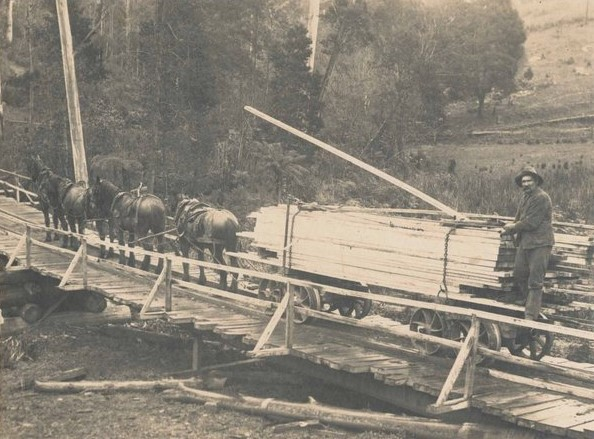
Horse-drawn Poweltown tramway at Black Sands Creek

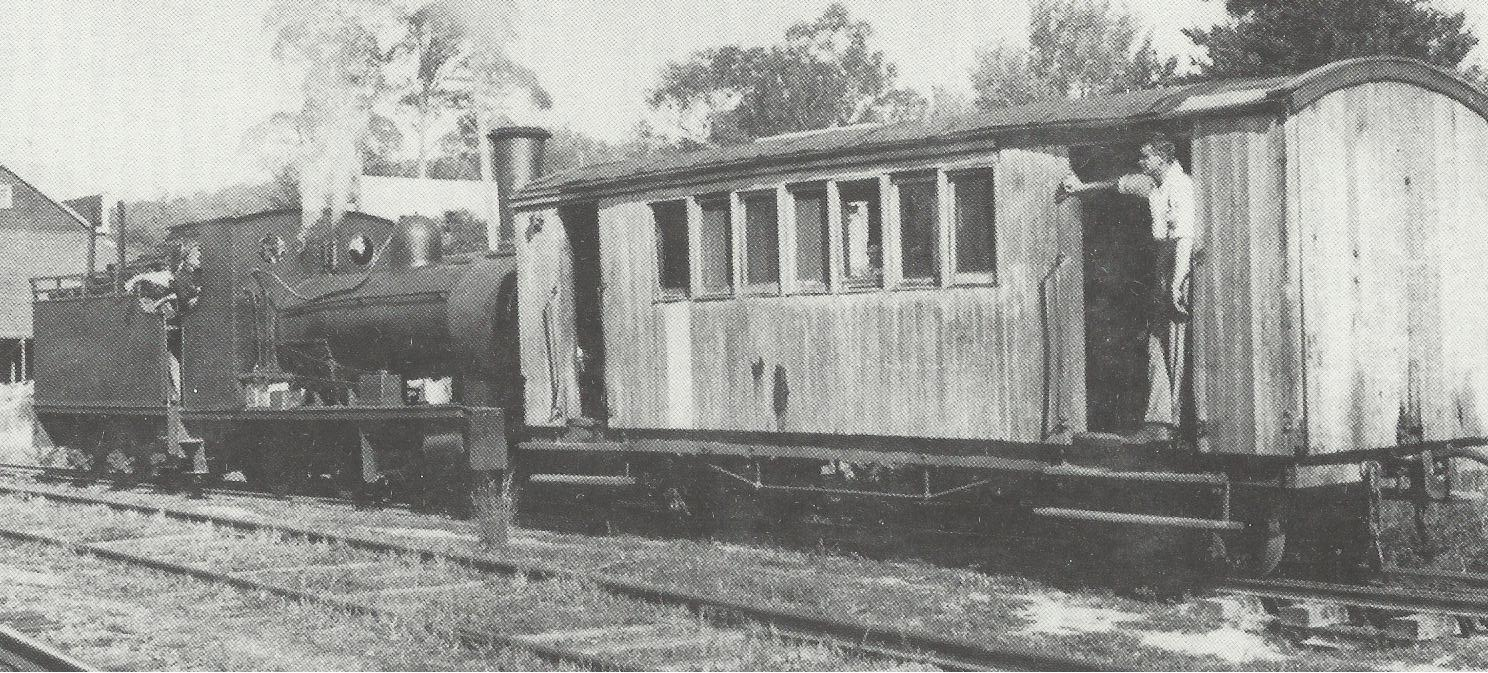
Powelltown Tramway, 1940s

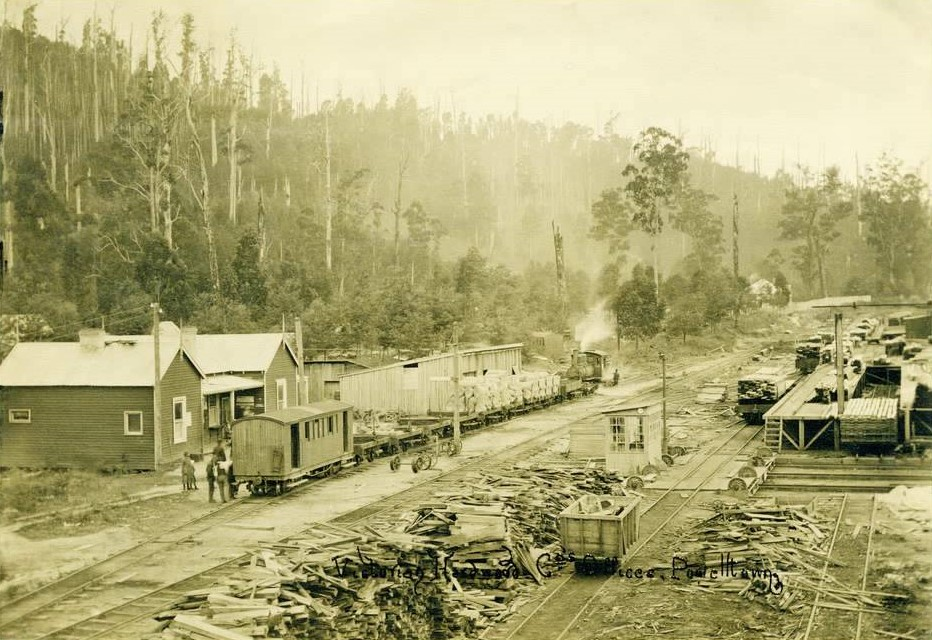
Powelltown tramway

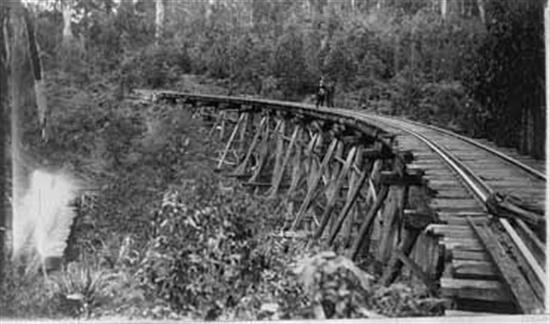
Trestle bridge
