= Kiso Forest Railway =

Light railway in Nagano Prefecture, Japan

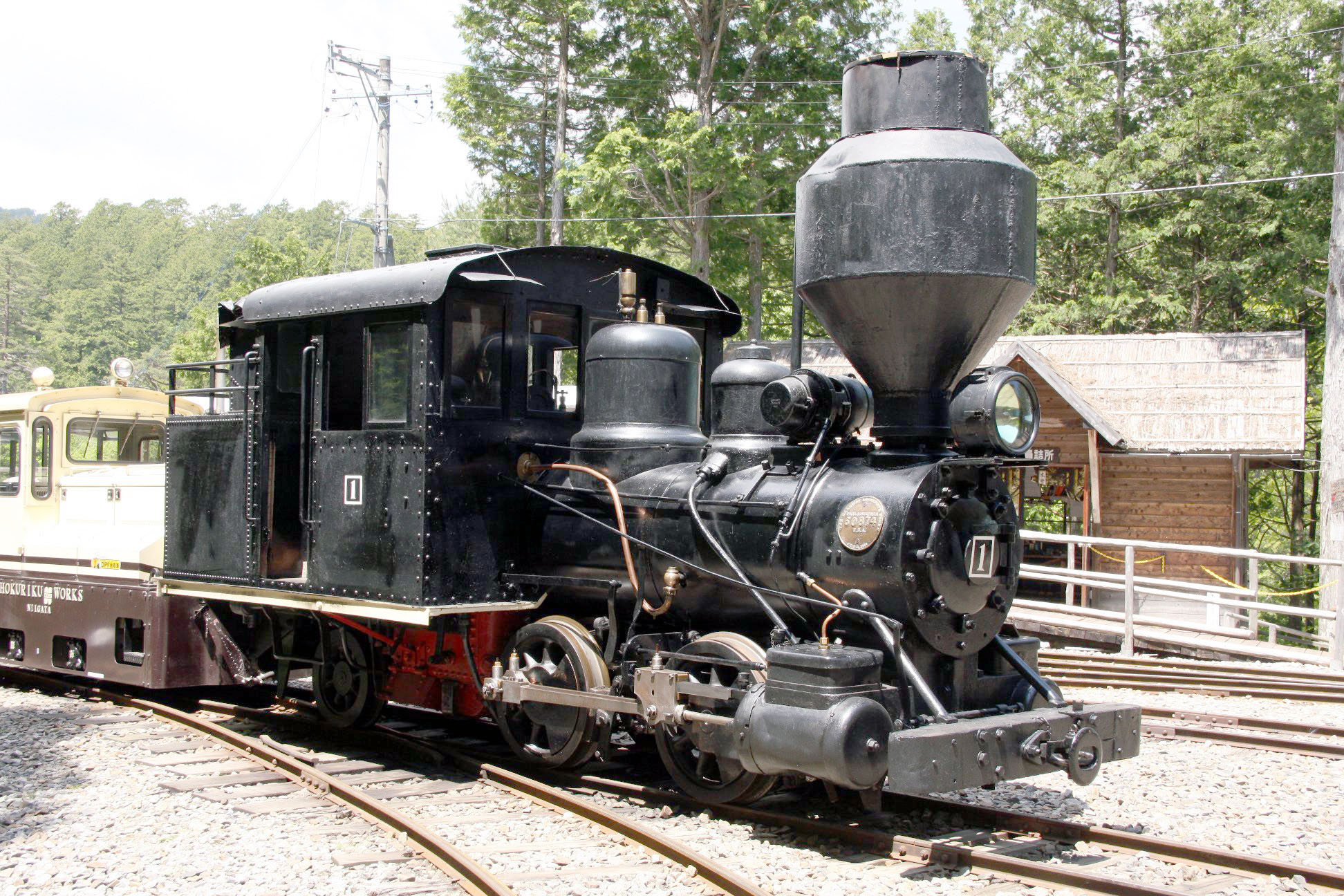
Baldwin-Locomotive

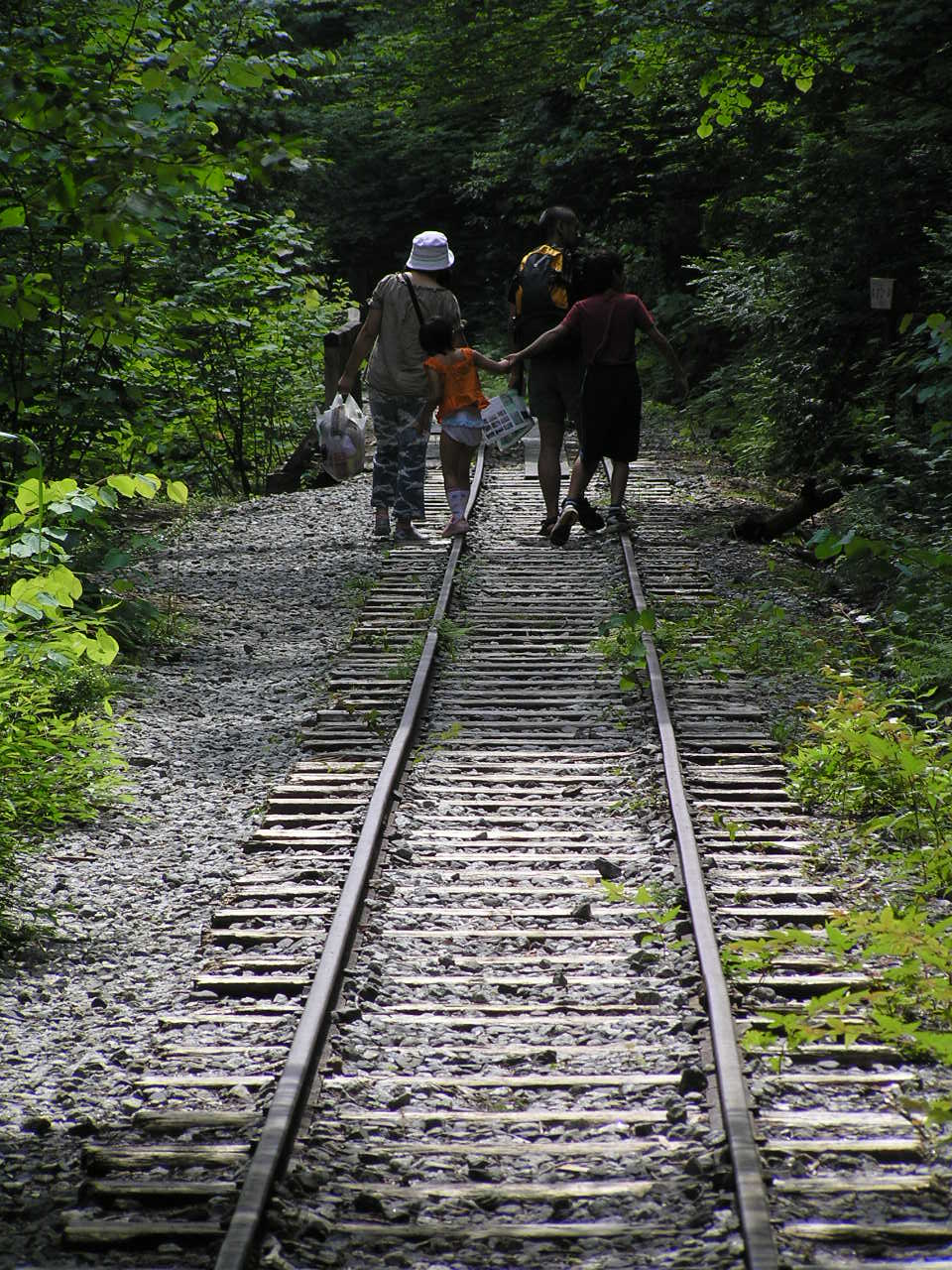

The Kiso Forest Railway (木曽森林鉄道, Kiso-shinrin-tetsudō) was a network of 400 km of 762 mm (2 ft 6 in) narrow gauge light (keiben (軽便)) railway lines that operated in the Kiso Valley in Nagano Prefecture, Japan.

The railway was used to support the logging of cedar forests in the region. The Kiso Forest had historically been the possession of a local lord, but at the time of the Meiji Restoration had become the property of the Imperial family. In 1901, a railway was laid into the forests and was initially worked by hand or animals. The first 0-4-2T locomotives built by Baldwin Locomotive Works were introduced in 1907. Further locomotives were obtained from Baldwin, as well as a Shay locomotive that was transferred to the Alishan Forest Railway in Taiwan when that line opened. The railway was extensively rebuilt in 1920, with steel bridges and 24 tunnels.

The railway was abolished in stages between 1966 and 1976.

== See also ==
- Tsugaru Forest Railway - another Japanese forest railway
