= Zelennik =

Zelennik Зеленник
- Settlement
- Location within Arkhangelsk Oblast Location within Russia
- Coordinates: 62°20′N 44°40′E
- Country: Russia
- Region: Arkhangelsk Oblast
- District: Verkhnetoyemsky District
- Time zone: UTC+3:00

Zelennik (Russian: Зеленник) is a rural locality (a settlement) in Verkhnetoyemsky District, Arkhangelsk Oblast, Russia. The population was 706 as of 2010. There are 20 streets.

== Geography ==
Zelennik is located on the Severnaya Dvina River, 32 km northwest of Verkhnyaya Toyma (the district's administrative centre) by road. Andreyevskaya and Larionovskaya are the nearest rural localities.
