= Powelltown Tramway Rail Trail =

Rail trail in Victoria, Australia

- Length: 43.5 km
- Location: Melbourne, Victoria, Australia
- Difficulty: Very Difficult
- Hazards: Track is overgrown and largely not maintained
- Surface: unknown
- Hills: Several very steep hills

The Powelltown Tramway Rail Trail is a trail developed in the 1970s on the route of the Powelltown Tramway in Victoria, Australia, but has since become overgrown due to lack of maintenance.
