= Kemence Forest Museum Railway =

Kemencei Erdei Múzeumvasút
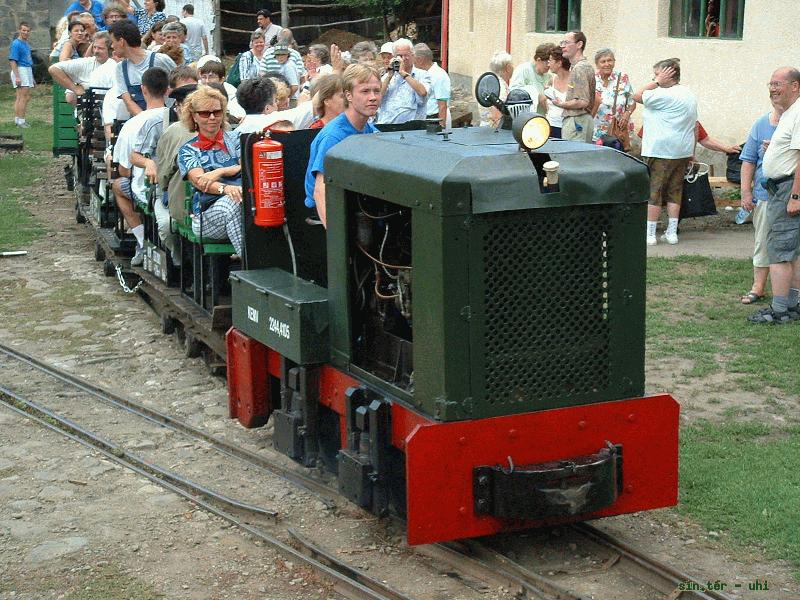

Overview
- Owner: Ipoly Erdő Zrt.
- Coordinates: 48.0133°N 18.8937°E
- Termini: Kemence; Feketevölgy
- Stations: 5
- Website: www.kisvasut.hu/kemence

Service
- Operator(s): Kisvasutak Baráti Köre Egyesület
- Depot(s): Kemence

History
- Opened: 1910

Technical
- Track length: 7.2 km (4.5 mi)
- Track gauge: 600 mm (1 ft 11 5/8 in)
- Loading gauge: 26 kN (40 kN after 2020-21 refurbishment)
- Operating speed: 15 km/h (9.3 mph)
- Highest elevation: 80 m (260 ft)

The Kemence Forest Museum Railway (Hungarian: Kemencei Erdei Múzeumvasút) is a narrow gauge railway in northern Hungary. It is operated by volunteers during weekends between late March and late October.

== History ==
=== The forest railway ===
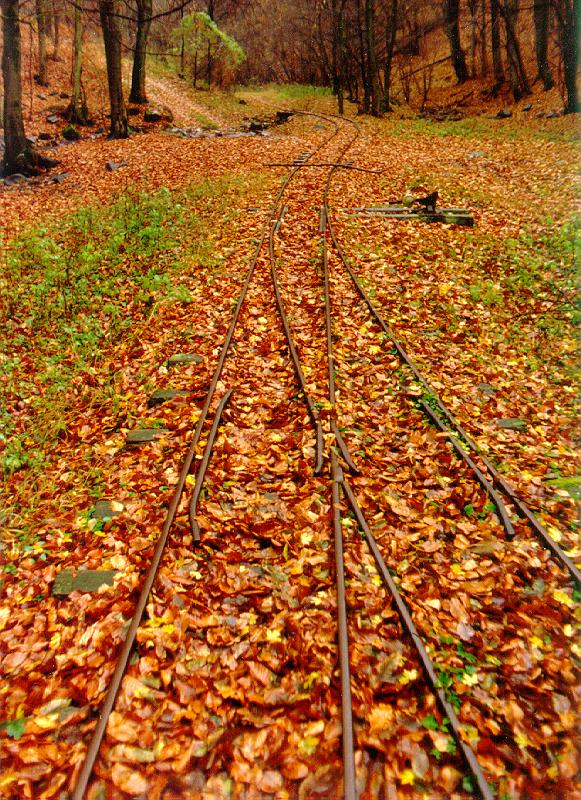
Halyagos terminus in 1991

The first railway line in Kemence was laid in 1910 between Kemence and Királyháza. The Csarnavölgy line, that is still in operation, was opened in 1913. After the two main lines were opened, several other minor railroads were constructed, most of them serving only some years.

Every line was created to continuously slope in the direction of the village, therefore horses (and later locomotives) were required only to distribute the empty carriages in the morning, and then, when the cars were loaded, they were only needed to be braked by a brakeman, the gravity successfully carried the cars down.

Throughout its history before 2000, the Kemence Forest Railway was never meant to transport passengers. There were no settlements around the railroad, and the forestry was not interested in creating a tourist railway.

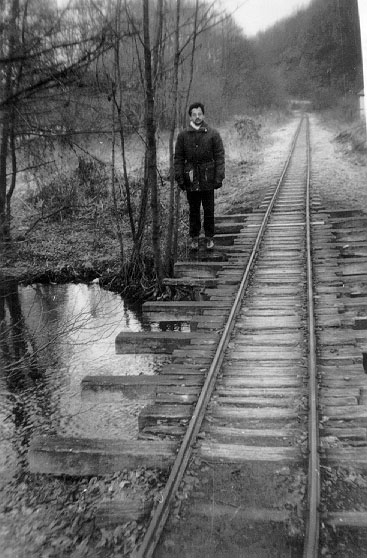
The first bridge in 1986, before the flood damages

The widespread of forestal roads meant that the railway has a dark future ahead itself. In 1968, the Királyháza line was abandoned. The last remaining Csarnavölgy line survived it with 22 years, officially closing in 1992, however, it had almost no function in its last years. However, the tracks remained, and the forestry didn't sell it.

=== A disastrous decade ===
After its abandonment, the conditions were fastly declining. In the last few years, only one locomotive remained viable. The track conditions became poor, with some of the rails being stolen.

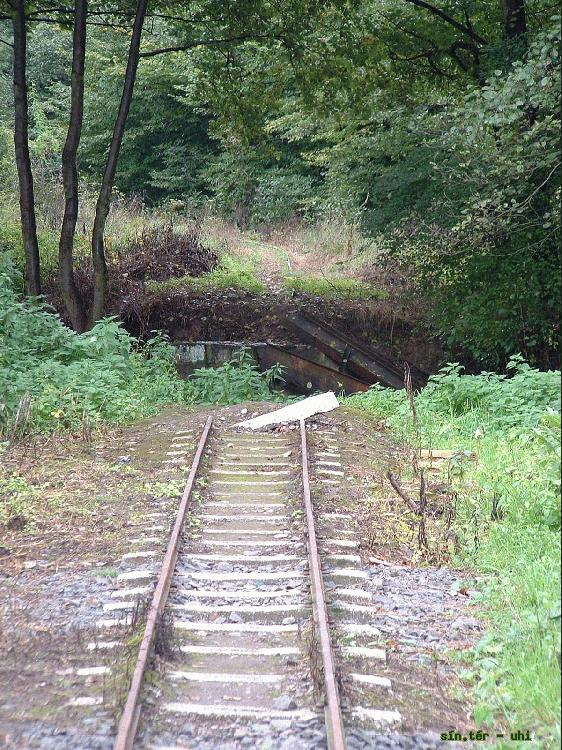
The bridge over Kemence creek at the plage in 2002, shortly before its restoration

In 1995, a flood damaged two of the bridges and some of the railroad embankment, and an even stronger one in 1999 destroyed almost everything in the valley, ruining all bridges except one, while only the tracks in the village's outer parts survived.

=== New times ===
Seeing the saddening fate of the railway, volunteers decided to save this unique railway. From 1 January 2000, the Kisvasutak Baráti Köre Egyesület ("Association of Narrow Gauge Railway Friends") loans the track and the properties from the forestry.

This was the first time the Kemence railway – renamed to its current name, Kemence Forest Museum Railway, referring to the museal rolling stock, most of which was saved from other 600 mm gauge railways that ceased to exist – became a tourist railway.

In the first four years, the railway operated in a short, but after the flood, intactly remained 1.8 km section between Kemence and Godóvár-Strand. After restoring three bridges and several stolen sections, the line was extended with another additional 1.8 km, to the now defunct Pityur-rétje station. Feketevölgy station was reached in 2009, and its second platform was built in 2015.

== Today ==
In January 2017, the railway is 4.1 kilometers long, with an additional 3.1 km waiting for renovation.

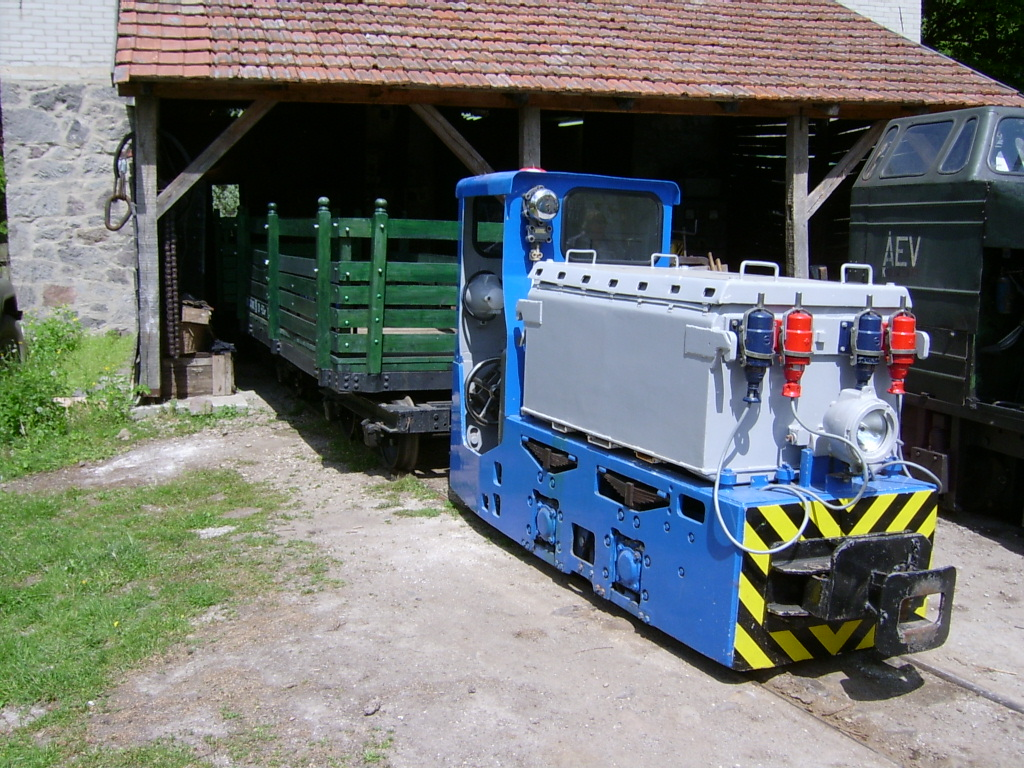
EL-9 electric mine locomotive in front of the depot, with a homemade open air passenger wagon

The rolling stock is very heterogeneous: the locomotives are mostly consisting of MD-40 locomotives either originating to Kemence, or found and saved from defunct railways, but you can find Ue-28 and MV engines as well, and Kemence is the sole forest railway in Hungary where electric (El-9) locomotives can be found. The passenger cars are mostly locally built.

In August of 2020 Ipoly Erdő Zrt. (the state forestry company, owner of the railway) started the complete refurbishment of operational section of the line. The new track is being built with brand new concrete sleepers, ballast and used "i" (23.6 kg/m) rails retrieved from Királyrét Forestry Railway's track. The main goal of this refurbishment is the raising the max. permitted axle load on the line (26 kN to 40 kN), so the traffic of heavier locomotives (with more traction power) as the recent MD-40's will become possible. More traction power could mean longer passenger trains with greater capacity. Additional benefit of the new track will be the better drainage and the less maintenance required.
