= Coal Creek, Washington =

Unincorporated community in Washington, United States

- Unincorporated community
- Location in the state of Washington Coal Creek (the United States)
- Coordinates: 46°12′00″N 123°01′00″W
- Country: United States
- State: Washington
- County: Cowlitz
- Elevation: 226 ft (69 m)
- Time zone: UTC−8 (PST)
  - Summer (DST): UTC−7 (PDT)
- ZIP Code: 98632
- Area code(s): 360, 564
- FIPS code: 53-13435
- GNIS feature ID: 1512102

Coal Creek is an unincorporated community in Cowlitz County, Washington. Coal Creek is located northwest of the city of Longview, reached by traveling westbound out of the city along Washington State Route 4, also known as Ocean Beach Highway, and turning north onto Coal Creek Road. The Coal Creek community is part of the Longview School District, a K-12 school district of about 6,600 students.
