= Eufaula, Washington =

Unincorporated community in Washington, United States

- Unincorporated community
- Location in the state of Washington Eufaula (the United States)
- Coordinates: 46°11′44″N 123°02′52″W
- Country: United States
- State: Washington
- County: Cowlitz
- Elevation: 394 ft (120 m)
- Time zone: UTC−8 (PST)
  - Summer (DST): UTC−7 (PDT)
- ZIP Code: 98632
- Area code(s): 360, 564
- FIPS code: 53-22485
- GNIS feature ID: 1512195

Eufaula is an unincorporated community in Cowlitz County, Washington. Eufaula is located northwest of the city of Longview, reached by traveling westbound out of the city along Washington State Route 4, also known as Ocean Beach Highway, turning north onto Coal Creek Road and then Harmony Drive.

The Eufaula community is part of the Longview School District, a K-12 school district of about 6,600 students.
