= Narrow-gauge railways in Germany =

A number of narrow-gauge lines survive, largely as a consequence of German reunification, in the former East Germany where some of them form part of the public transport system as active commercial carriers. Most extensive of those still employing steam traction is the Harz mountain group of metre-gauge lines, the Harzer Schmalspurbahnen. Other notable lines are the Zittau–Oybin–Jonsdorf line in Saxony, the Mollibahn and the Rügensche Kleinbahn on the Isle of Rügen on the Baltic coast and the Radebeul-Radeburg line, Weisseritztalbahn in the suburbs of Dresden. Although most rely on the tourist trade, in some areas they provide significant employment as steam traction is particularly labour-intensive.

In the Western part of Germany, Selfkantbahn (close to Heinsberg near Aachen) and Brohltalbahn (Linz/Rhine) are the best known ones, offering services in summer weekends.

== Baden-Württemberg ==
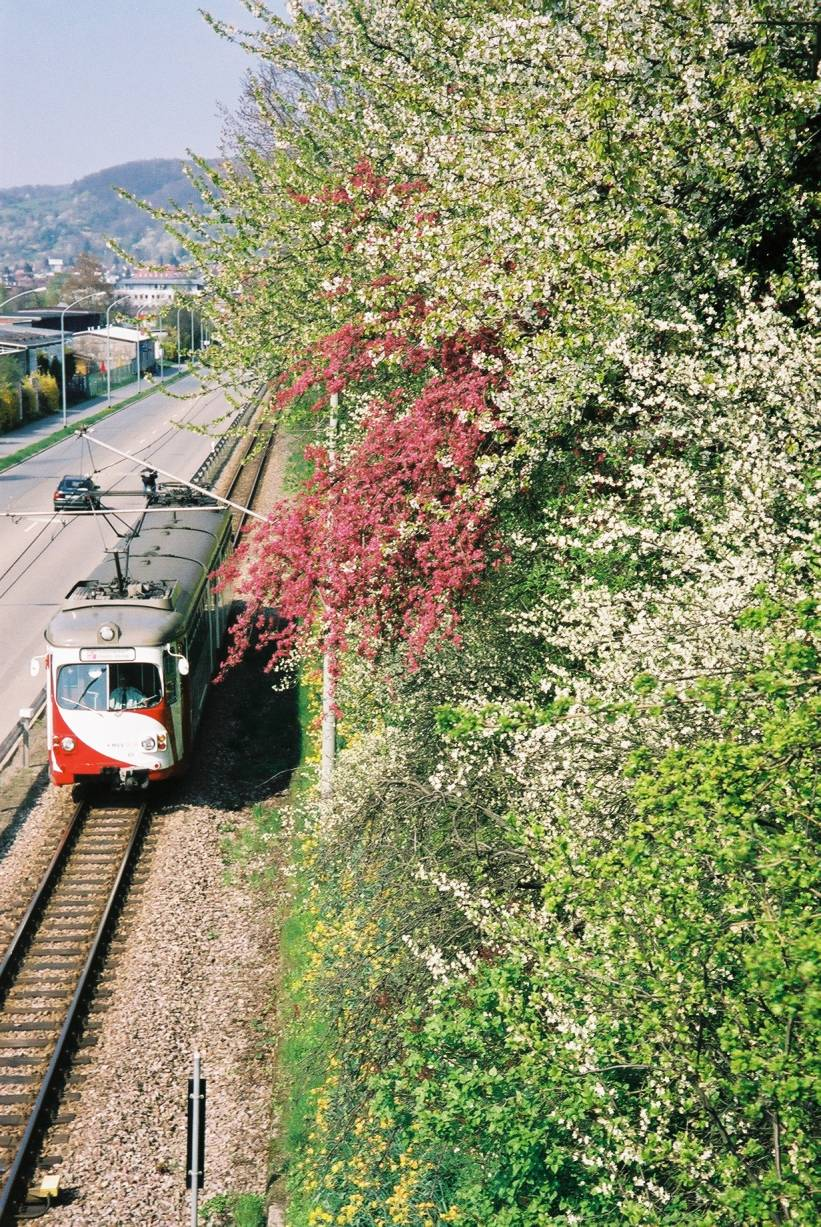
Oberrheinische Eisenbahn

1,000 mm (3 ft 3 3/8 in) gauge lines

- Albbähnle Amstetten (Württemberg) – Laichingen; closed in 1985, Currently Amstetten – Oppingen is a heritage railway
- Odenwaldexpress – Mosbach–Mudau; 27,51 km, closed in 1973.
- Filderbahn; from Möhringen to Vaihingen, Hohenheim, Degerloch, and Neuhausen auf den Fildern respectively Leinfelden-Echterdingen; converted to standard gauge in 1990.
- Härtsfeldbahn – Aalen–Dillingen an der Donau; 55,49 km, closed in 1972; heritage railway on part of the line.
- Lokalbahn Rhein–Ettenheimmünster; converted to standard gauge in 1922/1927
- Mittelbadische Eisenbahnen; converted to standard gauge in 1973, now closed.
- Obere Wiesentalbahn (Todtnauerli.); 1,000 mm (3 ft 3 3/8 in), closed in 1967
- Oberrheinische Eisenbahn – Mannheim–Heidelberg–Weinheim–Mannheim; currently operating as an electrified tram.
- Schmalspurbahn Nagold–Altensteig („Altensteigerle“); closed in 1967.

750 mm (2 ft 5 1/2 in) gauge lines

- Bottwartalbahn – Heilbronn-Süd–Marbach am Neckar; 37 km, closed in 1968.
- Federseebahn Bad Schussenried – Riedlingen; 29.34 km, closed in 1964.
- Jagsttalbahn Möckmühl – Dörzbach; 39,1 km, closed in 1988 and currently reconstructed as a heritage railway
- "Öchsle" – Since 1985 a heritage railway between Warthausen and Ochsenhausen
- Zabergäubahn – Lauffen am Neckar–Leonbronn; converted to standard gauge in 1964/1965, closed in 1994.

381 mm (15 in) gauge lines

- Killesbergbahn Stuttgart; 2,3 km (miniature railway).

== Bavaria ==
1,000 mm (3 ft 3 3/8 in) gauge lines

- Bayerische Zugspitzbahn from Garmisch-Partenkirchen to Zugspitze; 19 km, electrified cog railway
- Chiemsee-Bahn from Prien to Prien-Stock; 1,91 km
- Kleinbahn Wallersdorf–Münchshöfen; 7,7 km, closed in 1949
- Eichstätt-Kinding Bahn; 46,4 km, converted to standard gauge in 1934
- Staatliche Waldbahn Ruhpolding–Reit im Winkl; 22,5 km, closed in 1940
- Walhallabahn from Regensburg to Donaustauf; 23,4 km, closed in 1968
- Wendelsteinbahn from Brannenburg to Wendelstein; 7,66 km, electrified cog railway

900 mm (2 ft 11 7/16 in) gauge lines

- Wachtlbahn from Kiefersfelden to guesthouse Wachtl / Tirol; 6,1 km and electrified

600 mm (1 ft 11 5/8 in) gauge lines

- Neuhauser Bockerlbahn; 12 km, closed in 1922
- Riedlhütte narrow-gauge railway 1,0 km
- Spiegelauer Waldbahn; 100 km, closed in 1960
- Zwieselauer Waldbahn; 14,5 km, closed in 1958

== Berlin ==
600 mm (1 ft 11 5/8 in) gauge lines

- Berliner Parkeisenbahn; 7,50 km
- Britzer Museumsbahn; 5,0 km

== Brandenburg ==
1,000 mm (3 ft 3 3/8 in) gauge lines

- Spreewaldbahn („Bimmelguste“) from Lübben to Cottbus via Burg (Spreewald); most lines closed until 1970, last spurs converted to standard gauge in 1983.

750 mm (2 ft 5 1/2 in) gauge lines

- Jüterbog-Luckenwalder Kreiskleinbahnen (JLKB, „Märkische Bähnle“); closed in 1965
- Kleinbahnen der Kreise West- und Ostprignitz; closed until 1969, heritage railway "Pollo" relaid on a 9 km stretch.
- Kreisbahn Rathenow-Senzke-Nauen; 51,7 km, parts closed in the 1930s and in 1949, finally closed in 1961

600 mm (1 ft 11 5/8 in) gauge lines

- Cottbuser Parkeisenbahn; 3,20 km, in service

== Hesse ==
1,000 mm (3 ft 3 3/8 in) gauge lines

- Biebertalbahn; 9,5 km, closed

900 mm (2 ft 11 7/16 in) gauge lines

- Spessartbahn; 21,2 km, closed in 1951

800 mm (2 ft 7 1/2 in) gauge lines

- Ernstbahn; 7,6 km, closed

600 mm (1 ft 11 5/8 in) gauge lines

- Bad Orber Kleinbahn; former standard-gauge railway, partly relaid as a feldbahn to serve as a museum railway
- Frankfurter Feldbahnmuseum
- Kuhrbahn Bad Schwalbach; closed.

410 mm (16 5/32 in) gauge lines

- Kinderstraßenbahn Frankfurt am Main; 220 m.

== Lower Saxony ==
1,000 mm (3 ft 3 3/8 in) gauge lines

- Inselbahn Juist; 2,8 km, from 1896 to 1982, tracks lifted.
- Inselbahn Langeoog; 2,6 km.
- Kehdinger Kreisbahn; 51,8 km, closed.
- Kleinbahn Bremen–Tarmstedt; 27,0 km, closed in 1956.
- Kleinbahn Hoya – Syke – Asendorf
- Kreisbahn Aurich; 84,6 km, closed in 1969.
- Kreisbahn Emden–Pewsum–Greetsiel; 22,8 km, closed in 1963.
- Spiekerooger Inselbahn; 3,5 km, heritage railway.
- Steinhuder Meer-Bahn StMB; 52,7 km
- Südharz-Eisenbahn Walkenried–Wieda–Braunlage–Sorge–Tanne;
- Wangerooger Inselbahn; 5,9 km.

900 mm (2 ft 11 7/16 in) gauge lines

- Borkumer Kleinbahn; 7,5 km

750 mm (2 ft 5 1/2 in) gauge lines

- Bleckeder Kreisbahn; 47,25 km, closed.
- Gartetalbahn Göttingen – Duderstadt; 35,6 km, closed in 1957
- Hümmlinger Kreisbahn; 28,9 km, converted to standard gauge in 1957.
- Kleinbahn Lingen–Berge–Quakenbrück; 55,3 km, closed in 1952.
- Kleinbahn Ocholt – Westerstede; 7 km, converted to standard gauge in 1904.
- Kreisbahn Cloppenburg; 29,2 km, closed in 1952.
- Kreisbahn Osterode–Kreiensen; 32,7 km, converted to standard gauge in 1967.

600 mm (1 ft 11 5/8 in) gauge lines

- Inselbahn Baltrum; 0,6 km, Goods traffic from 1949 to 1985, tracks lifted.

== Mecklenburg-Vorpommern ==
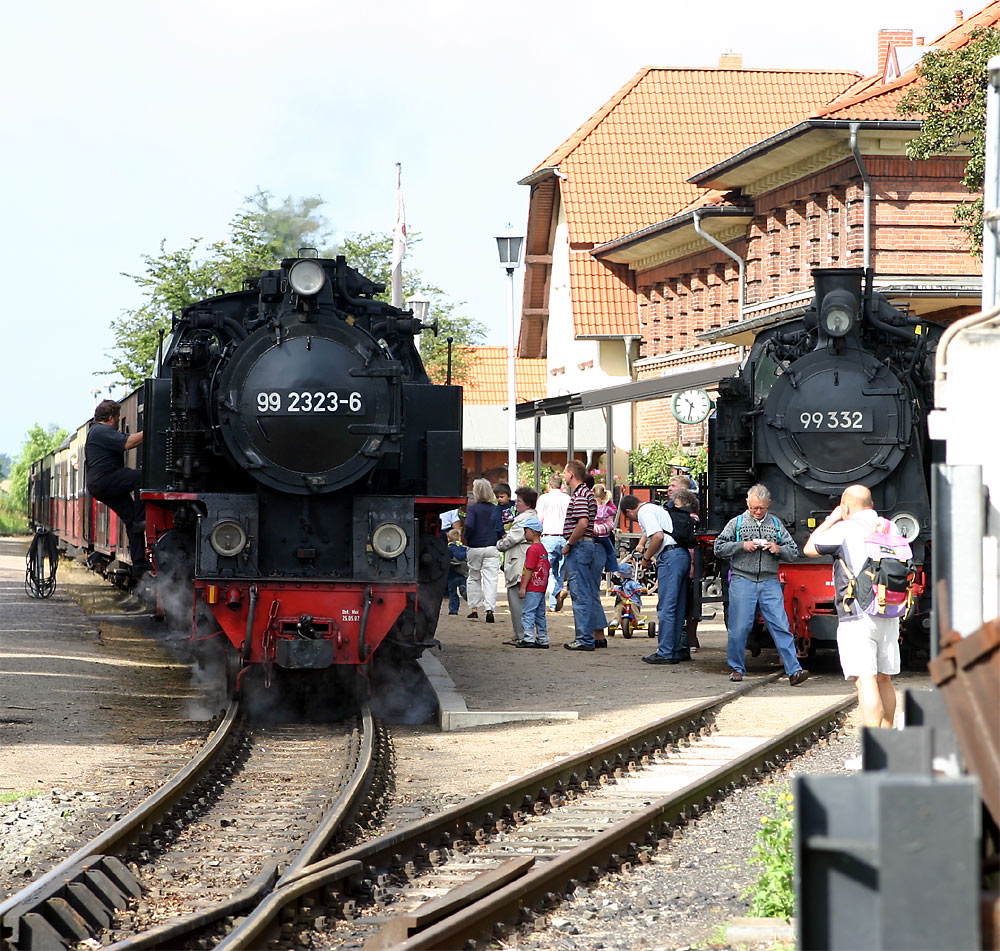
Bäderbahn Molli in Kühlungsborn

1,000 mm (3 ft 3 3/8 in) gauge lines

- Franzburger Kreisbahnen; 67,22 km, closed in 1971

900 mm (2 ft 11 7/16 in) gauge lines

- Bäderbahn Molli von Bad Doberan nach Kühlungsborn; 15,4 km
- Schmalspurbahn Neubukow Obere Weiche–Bastorf; 14,4 km, closed in 1946

750 mm (2 ft 5 1/2 in) gauge lines

- Rügensche Bäderbahn („Rasender Roland“); 59,4 km, on the island of Rügen
- Demminer Bahnen; 50,9 km, closed.

600 mm (1 ft 11 5/8 in) gauge lines

- Mecklenburg-Pommersche Schmalspurbahn (MPSB); closed in 1969, part revived as a heritage railway and some of its rolling stock being used on the Dampf-Kleinbahn Mühlenstroth railway

== North Rhine-Westphalia ==
1,000 mm (3 ft 3 3/8 in) gauge lines

- Bielefelder Kreisbahnen; 23 km, closed in 1956
- Drachenfelsbahn, cog railway; 1,5 km
- Dürener Eisenbahn; closed in 1965.
- Euskirchener Kreisbahnen; 57 km, closed in 1959
- Herforder Kleinbahn; 40,8 km, closed in 1966.
- Hohenlimburger Kleinbahn; closed in 1983
- Iserlohner Kreisbahn; 1900–1964
- Kleinbahn Haspe–Voerde–Breckerfeld; 18,39 km, closed in 1963
- Kreis Altenaer Eisenbahn; 14,6 km, closed in 1976.
- Leppetalbahn (Engelskirchen-Marienheider Eisenbahn); 18,4 km, closed in 1958.
- Märkische Museums-Eisenbahn e. V. (MME) – Sauerländer Kleinbahn, Museumseisenbahn im Elsetal, Herscheid-Hüinghausen – Köbbinghauser-Hammer; 2,3 km
- Plettenberger Kleinbahn (Plettenberger Straßenbahn AG); closed in 1962.
- Geilenkirchener Kreisbahn – in Kreis Heinsberg, partly operating as a heritage railway, the Selfkantbahn (GKB)
- Straßenbahn Essen; 52,5 km
- Tecklenburger Nordbahn; converted to standard gauge in 1935

785 mm (2 ft 6 29/32 in) gauge lines

- Bröltalbahn; 87,3 km, first narrow-gauge railway in Germany.

750 mm (2 ft 5 1/2 in) gauge lines

- Heisterbacher Talbahn; 7,2 km, 1891–1950
- Kleinbahn Steinhelle–Medebach; 36,3 km, closed in 1953.

600 mm (1 ft 11 5/8 in) gauge lines

- Feld- und Werksbahnmuseum Oekoven in Rommerskirchen-Oekoven (Rhein-Kreis Neuss); Museumsbahn
- Dampf-Kleinbahn Mühlenstroth; 1,5 km, heritage railway

== Rhineland-Palatinate ==
1,000 mm (3 ft 3 3/8 in) gauge lines

- Brohltalbahn („Vulkan-Express“) – Brohl (Rhein) – Engeln; 23,83 km, heritage railway
- Rhein-Haardtbahn – Bad Dürkheim–Ludwigshafen am Rhein–Mannheim; 16,4 km, electrified
- Pfälzer Lokalbahn – Ludwigshafen – Meckenheim; closed
- Nassauische Kleinbahnen; closed

750 mm (2 ft 5 1/2 in) gauge lines

- Kreuznacher Kleinbahnen; 28 km, closed in 1936.

== Saxony-Anhalt ==
1,000 mm (3 ft 3 3/8 in) gauge lines

- Harzer Schmalspurbahnen, 140 km network consisting of the Selketalbahn, Harzquerbahn and the Brockenbahn, the largest narrow-gauge network in Germany
- Industriebahn Halle; closed in 1992.
- Südharz-Eisenbahn-Gesellschaft; closed in 1963

750 mm (2 ft 5 1/2 in) gauge lines

- Mansfelder Bergwerksbahn; heritage railway on remaining 11.8 km

900 mm (2 ft 11 7/16 in) gauge lines

- Pfännerschaftliche Kohlebahn in Halle (Saale); 5.6 km, industrial railway, closed

== Schleswig-Holstein ==
1,000 mm (3 ft 3 3/8 in) gauge lines

- Apenrader Kreisbahn; 86 km, closed (reunited with Denmark in 1920)
- Eckernförder Kreisbahnen; 28,7 km, closed in 1959.
- Flensburger Kreisbahn; 49,5 km, closed in 1953.
- Haderslebener Kreisbahn; 18,5 km, closed (reunited with Denmark in 1920)
- Kleinbahn Niebüll–Dagebüll; 13,7 km, opened in 1895, converted to standard gauge in 1926
- Kreisbahn auf Alsen (Danish: Amtsbanerne på Als); 19 km, converted to standard gauge in 1933 (reunited with Denmark in 1920).
- Kreisbahn Norderdithmarschen; closed in 1937
- Rendsburger Kreisbahn; 46 km, closed in 1957.
- Sylter Inselbahn, closed in 1970.

900 mm (2 ft 11 7/16 in) gauge lines

- Amrumer Inselbahn; 14 km, closed in 1939.
- Halligbahn Dagebüll–Oland–Langeneß; 9 km

600 mm (1 ft 11 5/8 in) gauge lines

- Halligbahn Lüttmoorsiel–Nordstrandischmoor; 3,5 km

== Thuringia ==
1,000 mm (3 ft 3 3/8 in) gauge lines

- Feldabahn; 27,7 km, converted to standard gauge in 1934.
- Schmalspurbahn Eisfeld–Schönbrunn (Gründerla) in the Thuringian Forest; 17,8 km, closed in 1973.
- Heldburger Bahn in Grabfeld; 29,7 km, closed in 1946.
- Gera-Meuselwitz-Wuitzer Eisenbahn; 30,1 km, closed in 1969.
- Weimar-Buttelstedt-Großrudestedter Eisenbahn; 54 km, 1946 stillgelegt
- Part of the Harzer Schmalspurbahnen at Nordhausen

750 mm (2 ft 5 1/2 in) gauge lines

- Trusebahn in the Thuringian Forest (Wernshausen–Trusetal); 9 km, closed in 1966.

600 mm (1 ft 11 5/8 in) gauge lines

- Parkeisenbahn Gera; 0,8 km
- Feldbahn Brotterode-Wernshausen; in use only 1896/1897, later partly replaced by Trusebahn

== Wangerooge Island Railway ==
1,000 mm (3 ft 3 3/8 in) gauge lines

- Wangerooge Island Railway; 5,9 km

The single track Wangerooge Island Railway (Wangerooger Inselbahn) 1,000 mm (3 ft 3 3/8 in) located on the East Frisian island of Wangerooge off the northwestern coachen of Germany.

== Wiesloch Feldbahn and Industrial Museum ==
600 mm gauge railways in Germany

600 mm (1 ft 11 5/8 in) gauge lines

- Wiesloch Feldbahn and Industrial Museum; 0,65 km at Wiesloch.

== See also ==
- Arnold Jung Lokomotivfabrik
- Feldbahn
- Henschel & Son
- History of rail transport in Germany
- Klöckner-Humboldt-Deutz
- Krauss & Co.
- List of rack railways
- Mountain railway
- Orenstein & Koppel
- Rail transport in Germany
- Schöma
