= 600 mm gauge railways in Germany =

List of German 600mm narrow-gauge railways

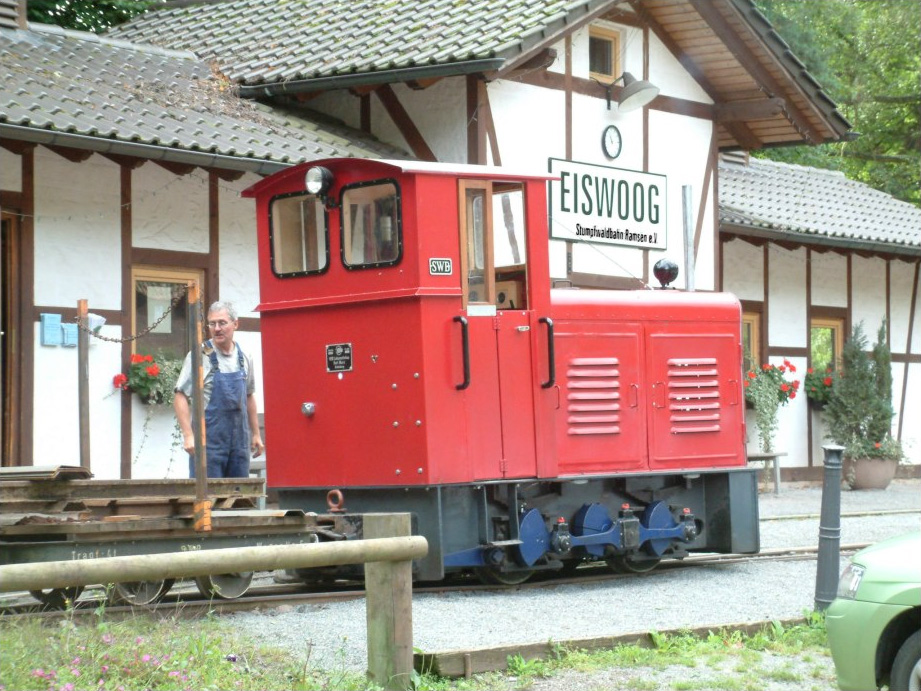
A diesel locomotive and flat wagon at Eiswoog Halt on the Stumpfwald Railway in Rhineland-Palatinate.

A list of 600 mm (1 ft 11 5/8 in) narrow-gauge railways in Germany.

Germany had extensive 600 mm (1 ft 11 5/8 in) installations which were used as a common-carrier railway, industrial, mining, peat, agricultural and hospital railways.

In addition, park and children's railways were constructed.

During both World Wars, extensive military railways were constructed, the so-called trench railways and Heeresfeldbahnen.

== Railways ==
State	Installations
Baden-Württemberg	Feldbahn Rechtenstein; 0.7 km, operating; Kinderstraßenbahn Rumpelstilzchen; 0.2 km, operating; Torfbahn im Wurzacher Ried; 1.5 km, a peat Feldbahn, operating; Schlossgartenbahn Karlsruhe; 2.7 km, a park railway, operating; Wiesloch Feldbahn and Industrial Museum; ~1.2 km, open-air museum, operating
Bavaria	Neuhauser Bockerlbahn; 12 km, defunct; Reuth–Friedenfels line; 6.6 km, defunct; Sandbahn Pleinfeld; 2 km, defunct; Spiegelau Forest Railway; 100 km, defunct; Zwieselauer Waldbahn; 14.5 km, defunct
Berlin	Berliner Parkeisenbahn; 7.50 km, operating; Britzer Museumsbahn; 5.0 km, operating
Brandenburg	Cottbuser Parkeisenbahn; 3.20 km, operating
Hesse	Bad Orber Kleinbahn; former standard-gauge railway, partly relaid as a museum railway Feldbahn, operating; Bad Schwalbacher Kurbahn; 1.6 km, operating; Bebra narrow gauge railway museum; operating; Feld- und Grubenbahnmuseum Fortuna; 2.5 km, operating; Frankfurter Feldbahnmuseum; 1.5 km, operating; Grubenbahnen Messel; 1.5 km, defunct; Industriebahn Roßdorf; 4 km, defunct; Lindelbachbahn; 4.4 km, defunct; Palmen-Express; operating; Wächtersbach–Bad Orb line; 6.5 km, operating
Lower Saxony	Burgsittensen Moor Railway; operating; Feldbahn Büsenbachtal; 0.9 km, Feldbahn, defunct; Feldbahnmuseum Hildesheim; operating; Inselbahn Baltrum; 0.6 km, goods traffic from 1949 to 1985, defunct; Weetzen–Bredenbecker Kalkwerke; 6.9 km, defunct
Mecklenburg-Vorpommern	Anklam-Lassaner Kleinbahn; 32.6 km, defunct; Mecklenburg-Pommersche Schmalspurbahn; 250 km, defunct; Pioniereisenbahn Prerow; 2 km, defunct
North Rhine-Westphalia	Dampf-Kleinbahn Mühlenstroth; 1.5 km, operating; Feldbahn Schermbeck; defunct; Feldbahnmuseum Oekoven; 1 km, operating; Grugabahn; 3.3 km, operating; Kleinbahn im Rheinpark; 2 km, operating; Kleinbahn im Westfalenpark; 2.7 km, operating; Wallückebahn; 17 km, defunct
Rhineland-Palatinate	Stumpfwald Railway; operating; Wasgauwaldbahn; 14.5 km, defunct
Saarland	Parkeisenbahn Saarbrücken; 2 km, operating
Saxony	Görlitzer Oldtimer Parkeisenbahn; a park railway, operating; Parkeisenbahn Chemnitz; a park railway, operating; Parkeisenbahn Plauen; 1 km, a park railway, operating; Sächsisches Schmalspurbahn-Museum Rittersgrün; a park railway, operating; Waldeisenbahn Muskau; 50 km, a forest railway, part operating; Waldheim–Kriebethal line; regauged to standard gauge, defunct
Saxony-Anhalt	Feldbahn des Sodawerkes Staßfurt; 2 km, operating; Parkeisenbahn Peißnitzexpress Halle; operating; Pferdebahn Patzetz–Breitenhagen; horse-drawn railway, 11.5 km, defunct; Pioniereisenbahn Magdeburg; 2.2 km, defunct; Rimpau-Bahn; 7 km, Feldbahn, defunct; Strube-Bahn; Feldbahn, a part survives as the Museumsfeldbahn Schlanstedt, operating
Schleswig-Holstein	Buchhorster Waldbahn; 6 km, operating; Laboe ammunition depot Feldbahn; 28 km, defunct; Halligbahn Lüttmoorsiel–Nordstrandischmoor; 3.5 km, operating; Malente-Gremsmühlen–Lütjenburg line; 17 km, converted to standard gauge, operating
Thuringia	Feldbahn Brotterode–Wernshausen; 11.5 km, defunct; Parkeisenbahn Gera; 0.8 km, operating; Steinbacher Bergwerksbahn; 6 km, defunct

== See also ==
- Narrow-gauge railways in Germany
