= Genoa–Casella railway =

Narrow gauge railway line in Liguria, Italy

Genoa–Ferrovia Railway Ferrovia Genova-Casella
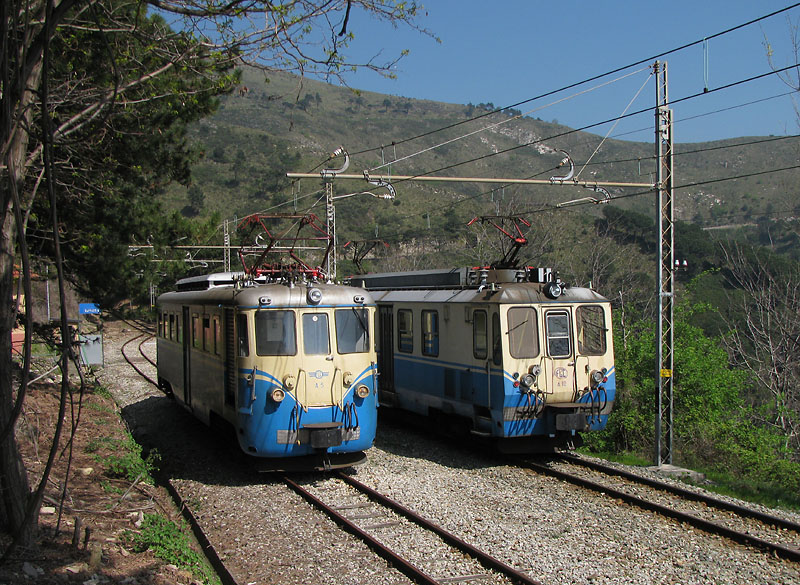
- Electromotive A5 and A10 railing on Ferrovia Genova Casella

Overview
- Status: Operational
- Owner: Regione Liguria
- Locale: Trenino di Casella
- Termini: Genova Piazza Manin; Casella Paese
- Stations: 20

Service
- Type: Narrow-gauge railway
- Operator(s): AMT Genova

History
- Opened: 1 September 1929

Technical
- Line length: 24.318 kilometres (15.11 mi)
- Number of tracks: 1 main track with dual track at certain stations and 1 zig zag.
- Track gauge: 1,000 mm (3 ft 3 3/8 in) metre gauge
- Electrification: 3000 V DC
- Operating speed: 40 kilometres per hour (25 mph)

The Genoa–Casella railway is a narrow gauge (1000 mm) railway in Liguria (Italy) that connects the city of Genoa to Casella, a village in the mountains inland from the city.

It operates nine trains per day and it is used for both commuting and tourist purposes; it crosses three valleys and it was opened in 1929.

While it is owned by Liguria Region, it has been operated since 2010 by AMT Genova.

== History ==
=== The origins: the Ligurian Electric Railways ===
At the end of the nineteenth century, a direct railway link between Genoa and Emilia Romagna was proposed, as an alternative to the Turin–Genoa railway. The railway had to start from the Port of Genoa and cross the Ligurian Apennines and then reach the Piacenza railway station and Borgotaro. However, it was designed as a fast line for long distances, with traffic mainly dedicated to goods.

In this scenario, SAFEL (Società Anonima Ferrovie Elettrici Liguri) studied the construction of a passenger line for local use, complementary to Genoa-Piacenza, whose purpose was to connect the city center to all the small municipalities and holiday resorts of the Ligurian hinterland, otherwise not served by any rapid transport system. The first section of this extended network was made up of the Genoa-Casella.

The original project later envisaged a "T" development: a transversal branch towards Busalla and one towards Torriglia, the latter with the prospect of a second phase of expansion towards the Piacenza area.

Subsequently, SAFEL studied several proposals for further branches, structured in part as extra-urban tramways: from Torriglia towards Bobbio with a branch to La Spezia via Sestri Levante (eastern network). In a wide-ranging perspective, the Ligurian Electric Railways should have connected with the other existing lines such as the Turin-Genoa or the Alessandria–Piacenza railway. Alongside these there was also a proposal for a western network of the FEL composed of lines not interconnected with each other: it was the Savona - Sassello - Ovada, the Finale Ligure - Calizzano - Cengio and the Imperia - Pieve di Teco - Ormea with a branch to Albenga.

=== Construction ===
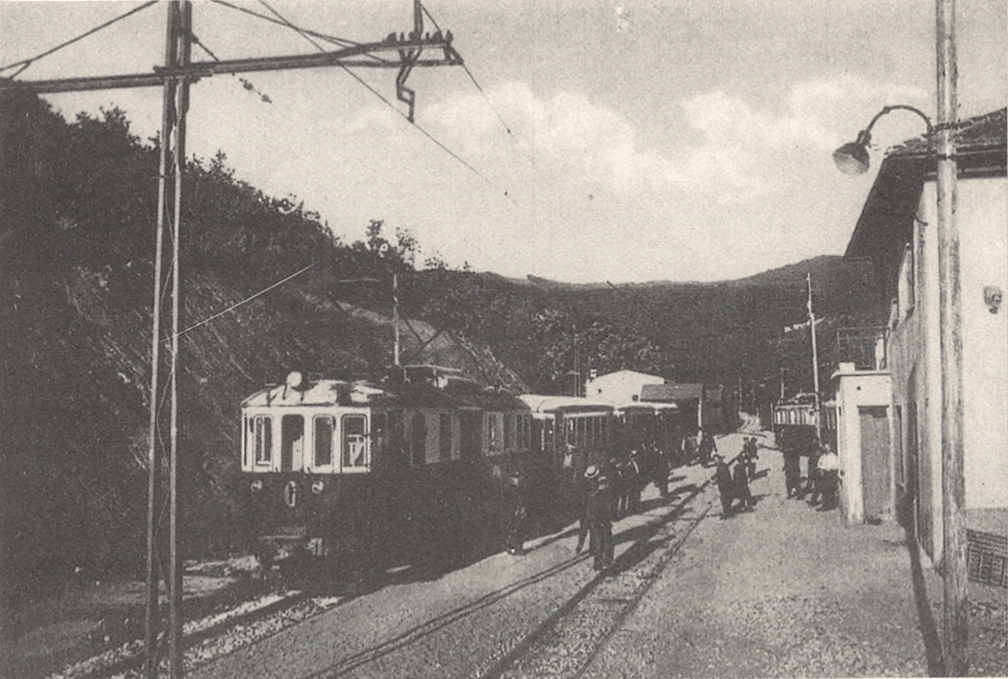
The arrival of the first train in Casella on September 1, 1929

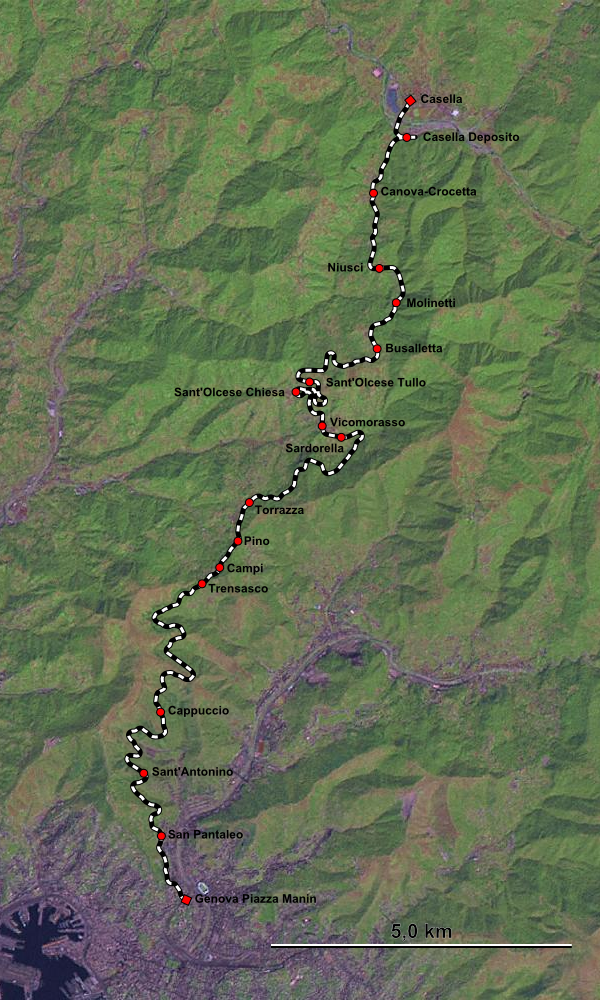
Genoa-Casella Map

In 1908 SAFEL applied to the Ministry for the concession for the construction of the Genoa-Casella. This concession was obtained on June 17, 1915. Like most of the local railways of the time, the line was almost entirely single-tracked and had a very winding alignment (in order to follow the orography of the Ligurian mountains). Electrification was immediately planned for the railway, while the narrow gauge at 950 mm was initially thought to reduce infrastructure costs and in accordance with the provisions of the Superior Council of Public Works which recommended the adoption of the "Italian metric" (950 mm) for railways unlike the pure metric (1000 mm) adopted for tramways. However, to allow the construction of a connection in Manin with the Genoese tram network, the operating company presented a variation to the project, approved by the Superior Council of Public Works, which provided for the adoption of the 1000 mm gauge. This connection, however, although reported in the first design tables, was never realized.

The coming of the First World War imposed a long delay to the construction of the railway line. It was not until 28 February 1921 that the final agreement between the Government and SAFEL was signed, which gave the formal start to the construction sites.

On June 26, 1921 the first stone was laid: the works for the civil works (tunnels, bridges, station buildings) were entrusted to the Consorzio Cooperative Liguri di Produzione e Lavoro tra Combattenti, which had the purpose of giving work to thousands of former soldiers and workers who remained unemployed after the conflict. The construction was entirely financed with private funds.

The construction of the line turned out to be more complex than expected: during the construction of the downstream section (Genoa-Trensasco), where the track had to face steep climbs, a 1.2 km-long cable car was installed in order to easily transport the building materials coming from Valbisagno, overcoming a difference in height of 450 m. Electric excavators and crushers (modern machinery at the time) were also adopted to produce the necessary sand and cement on site.

In 1924 the S.E.N. (Società Elettrica Nazionale), a subsidiary of the Ernesto Breda industries, was awarded the contract for the laying of the track, for the construction of the overhead line, the electrical substations and for the supply of rolling stock.

Meanwhile, the succession of numerous extension projects in different directions, some of which were very unlikely, required the use of considerable financial resources, causing the progressive economic instability of the company and also ending up slowing down the construction of the central trunk.

The first tracks were laid in 1926 starting from Vicomorasso, with the help of a Mallet-type steam locomotive purchased by the Ferrovie dell'Appenno Centrale, but operations were interrupted due to lack of funds.

Thanks to economic aid (from the Municipality of Genoa and the National Bank), in 1927 the works resumed, entrusted to the Breda company, which in addition to the electrification of the line and the laying of the track was responsible for completing the remaining civil works (the bridge between the two Fontanassa tunnels, the Cicala and Puin viaducts).

On June 7, 1928, the steam locomotive used in the construction of the line itself made a presentation trip to Casella pulling a passenger car with the Podestà of Genoa, Sant'Olcese, Serra Riccò and Casella on board, welcomed by the citizens in celebration along the way. Only on October 2, 1928 was the first electric train – reserved for the two hundred members of the Italian Electrotechnical Association which in those days held its annual congress in Genoa – able to circulate on the entire line.

On 1 September 1929 the official inauguration of the line took place, which started from Piazza Manin but was limited to Casella-Deposito.

Due to the lack of external funding, the ambitious project of the Ligurian railway network was never completed, and Casella became the terminus.

=== Early years and private management ===
During the first period of activity, the railway carried out a mixed freight-passenger service, enjoying good success in terms of users.

The direct-current electrification was originally used 2400 V. The fleet of first equipment consisted of the vehicles supplied by Breda: 3 locomotives-trunk (001-003) with Bo'Bo' running gear and 360 horsepower, characterized by an innovative Breda-Somarini energy recovery system, unique in Italy; 4 third-class carriages (50-53); 3 mixed first-third class (20-22) and 16 freight wagons of various types (delivered in 1926, well before the railway opened).

In 1930 the final section of the line was completed in Casella, consisting of the Vittorio Veneto bridge over the Scrivia stream, but the railway was not immediately extended along the route.

In 1933, even though the railway was operating at full capacity with a high numbers of passengers and freight, SAFEL was on the verge of bankruptcy. This was because the company had invested heavily in the extension projects without bothering to pay off outstanding debts with Breda and banca Nazionale del Lavoro, which had financed much of the construction of the line.

In 1934 SAFEL was declared bankrupt after a court trial, and the management of the railway was acquired by the Lazzi bus companies.

On 23 August 1937 two of the locomotives were destroyed in an accident near Vicomorasso in which five people were killed; to remedy the shortage of engine material, three electromotives were purchased by the Società Veneta, built by MAN in 1913 with running gear (A1) (1A) for the Montebelluna-Asolo and Montebelluna-Valdobbiadene tramways closed in 1931.

The machines entered service in 1939, initially maintaining the original numbering (053, renumbered 055 in 1943, 054 and 056), after conversion of the original power supply system from 975 Vdc to 2400 Vdc.

During the Second World War the railway did not suffer particular damage, despite the bombings that raged on the city of Genoa. On the contrary, in that period there was the maximum exploitation of the line, used assiduously by displaced Genoese families (Casella, along with many inland places, was considered a safe place) and by workers who starting from the hills had to reach the city.

=== Post-World War II and state management ===
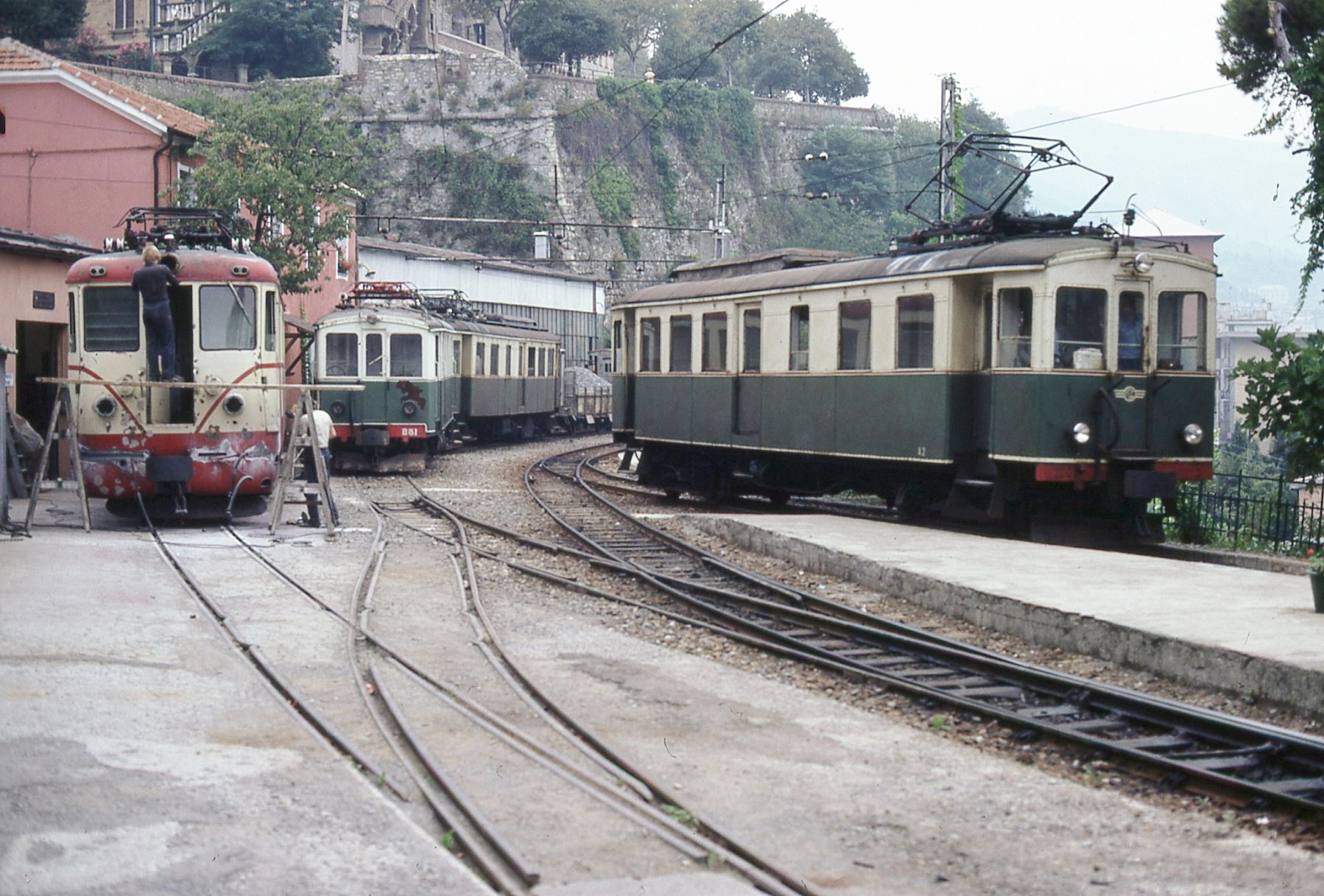
Trains stopped at Manin station as they appeared in 1980

The railway, like many lines granted, remained private until 1949, when it passed into government commissioner management.

At the end of the war both the rolling stock and the structures had been damaged by the wear to which they had been subjected during the war, and the need to renew the traction park began to be felt.

In 1953 the extension in regression was finally realized, entirely in the road, from the old to the new terminus station, called Casella-Paese, while the Casella-Deposito station remained active only as a technical stopover.

In 1956 a locomotive (unit 28) with a power of 355 kW with a maximum speed of 50 km/h already used on the Sangritana Railway was acquired by the FAA; in 1960 another unit (the 29) and spare parts were acquired. The locomotives were part of a contract of fourteen four-axle locomotives built in 1924 with electrical equipment and bogies supplied by TIBB and case made by Carminati & Toselli. Originally narrow-gauge at 950 mm, they were converted to the metric one.

In the years of mass motorization, the Genoa Casella Railway survived thanks to the low maintenance and operating costs, combined with the lack of a satisfactory road network, especially in the first half of the route.

The fleet was integrated and modernized by recovering rolling stock abandoned by other railways gradually suppressed.

In 1963, with the closure of the Ora-Predazzo metre gauge line, managed by the Val di Fiemme Electric Railway, the Genoa Casella Railway inherited the two locomotives B51 and B52 with Bo'Bo' running gear, 420 horsepower and a maximum speed of 45 km/h; three electromotives (A1-A3) built by TIBB for the electrical equipment and by C&T for the mechanical part in 1929. Also from Val di Fiemme came six carriages with bogies, two of which are of the long type classified as C101 and C102 and four of short type numbered from C103 to C106 and finally two static mercury converters, which were installed in the electrical substation of Vicomorasso, where the original rectifiers with rotating groups were replaced and the voltage of the contact line was raised from 2.4 to 2.6 kV in direct current. Since the new static converters no longer allowed the recovery of energy, all the original traction material and that coming from the Venetian Company was set aside and subsequently demolished.

Five years later four electromotives were purchased by the Spoleto-Norcia railway: these were vehicles built by C&T\TIBB in 1926 and rebuilt by Casaralta\TIBB in 1957 with new electrical equipment. Transferred to Genoa in 1970, they entered regular service, numbered A4-A7, between 1971 and 1973 after having provided the necessary variation of gauge from 950 mm to 1000 mm.

On January 17, 1974, the A3 electromotive derailed due to a landslide in Sardorella, causing one death. On October 31 of the same year the entire line was placed under seizure by order of the judiciary and can be reopened to traffic only after the completion of the most urgent works. Thus in 1975 a work of renewal of the armament was carried out, with 36 kg/m rails instead of the original 27 kg/m rails and a third central rail in the curved sections to limit the risk of derailment. These interventions made it possible to raise the maximum speed of the line.

The modernization of the network and rolling stock continued in successive phases in the following years: in 1980 the expansion of the bridge over the Scrivia was carried out with the movement of the last section of the line, first in promiscuous location, and construction of a doubling track in Casella Paese. The application of a new amaranth and cream painting scheme began for all passenger material and the Gleismac company was commissioned to re-body 9 out of 12 cars with the exception of the C22, previously transformed into a bar-carriage and became part of the Historic Train, and the C103-104, also assigned to the Historic Train. The A1 and A2 electromotives were rebuilt maintaining the traditional aesthetics in the following years by the social workshops. Finally, in 1985, the A3 electromotive with a completely redesigned case, chopper electrical equipment made by the EEA company of Genoa and two Faiveley pantographs with double strip already tested on the B51 and A4 returned to service. Two years later the Gleismac company supplied the FGC with a diesel-hydraulic locomotive classified D1 with B'B' running gear, power 400 kW and maximum speed of 40 km/h, built in 1964 for the Deutsche Bundesbahn, which was used at the head of construction trains and as a rescue locomotive.

== Sources ==
- Corrado Bozzano; Roberto Pastore; Claudio Serra (2016). Storia illustrata della Ferrovia Genova-Casella. Recco (GE): Il Geko Edizioni. ISBN 978-88-9800-463-8.
