= Zig zag (railway) =

Type of railway line used to climb steep gradients

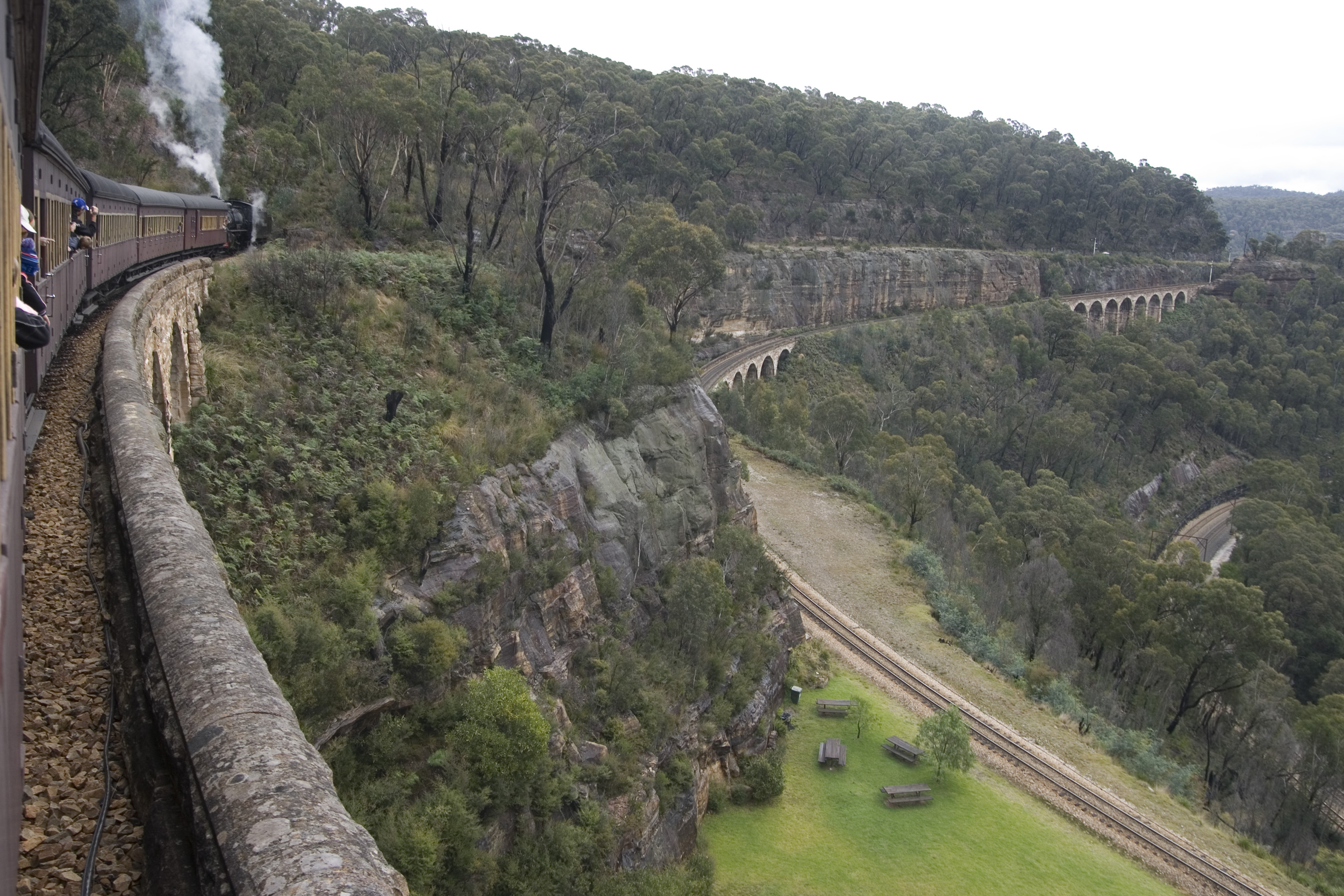
Australia: the Lithgow Zig Zag, 2008

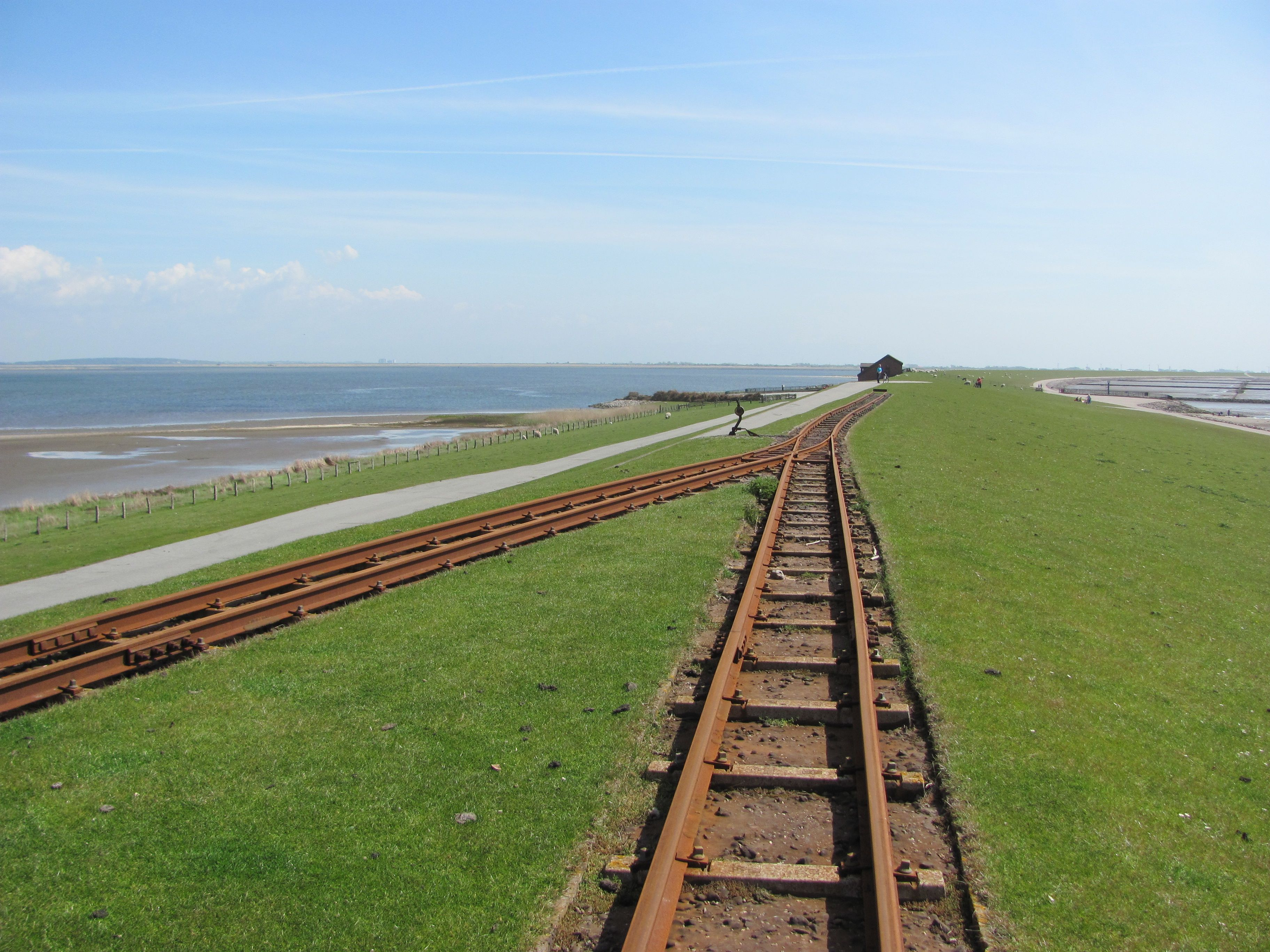
Germany: zig zag required to cross the outer dyke on the railway serving the island of Nordstrandischmoor, 2010

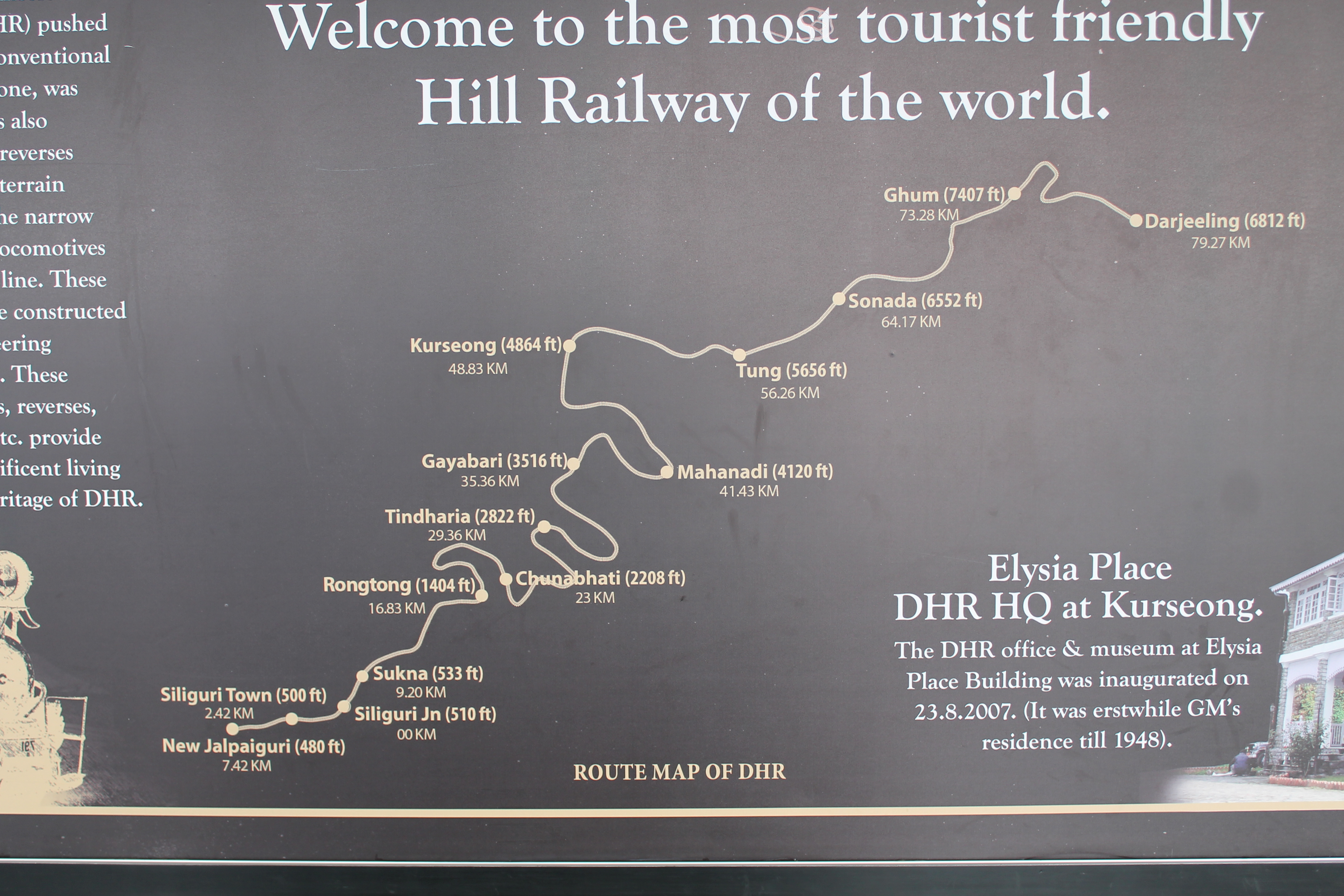
India: the Darjeeling Himalayan Railway, a UNESCO World Heritage Site, with six full zig zags

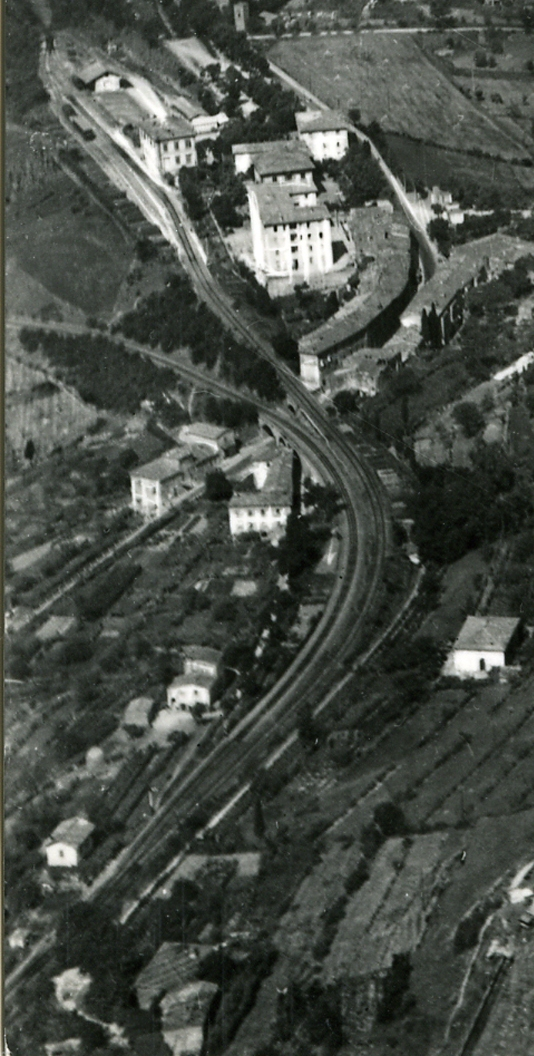
Italy: zig zag on the Cecina-Volterra railway, 1938

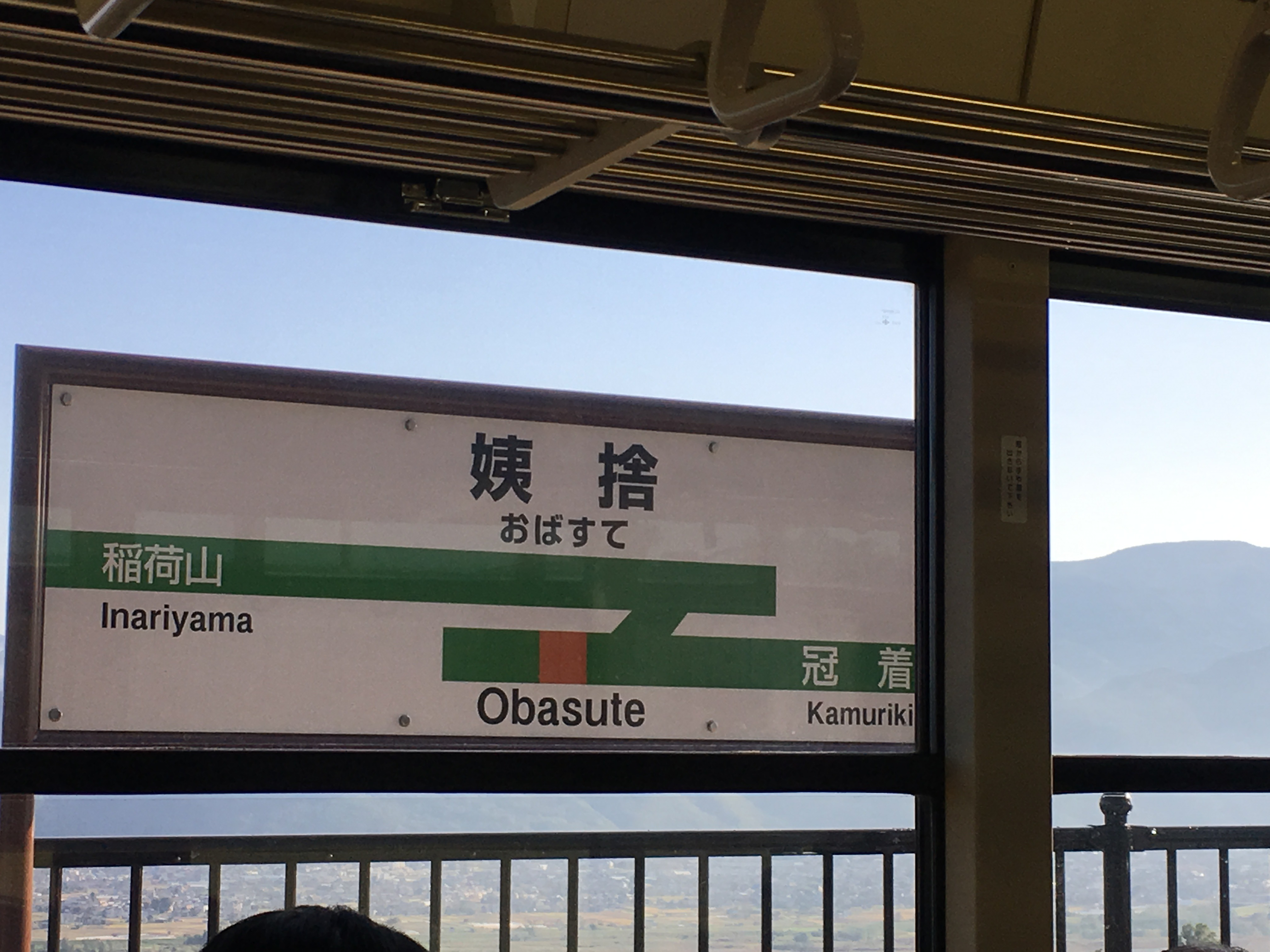
Japan: Obasute Station platform sign displaying the switchback, 2018

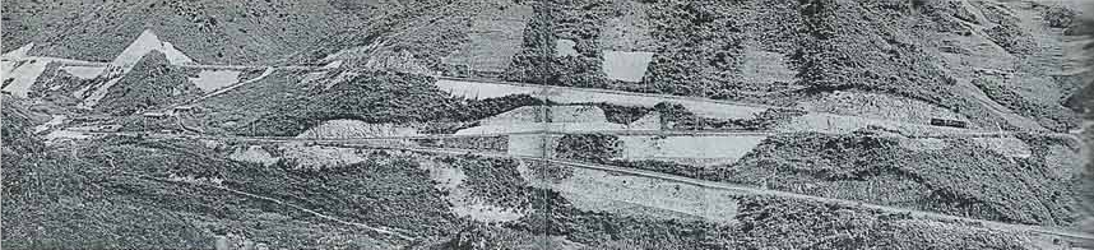
North Korea: switchback between Tanballyŏng and Malhwiri, 1931

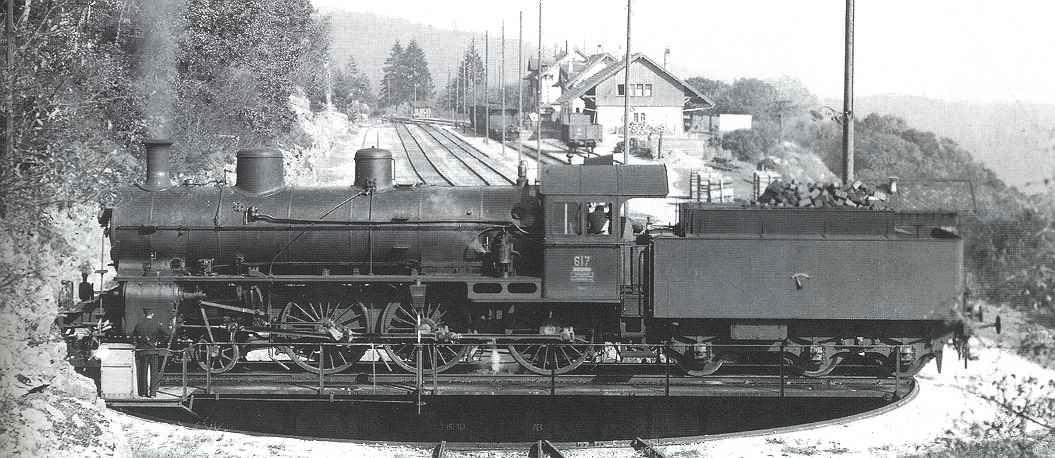
Switzerland: SBB A 3/5 locomotive on the turntable at Chambrelien railway station, before 1931

A railway zig zag or switchback is a railway operation in which a train is required to switch its direction of travel to continue its journey. While this may be required purely from an operational standpoint, it is also ideal for climbing steep gradients with minimal need for tunnels and heavy earthworks. For a short distance (corresponding to the middle leg of the letter "Z"), the direction of travel is reversed, before the original direction is resumed. Some switchbacks do not come in pairs, and the train may then need to travel backwards for a considerable distance.

A location on railways constructed by using a zig-zag alignment at which trains must reverse direction to continue is a reversing station.

One of the best-known examples is the Darjeeling Himalayan Railway, a UNESCO World Heritage Site railway in India, which has six full zig zags and three spirals.

== Advantages ==
Zig zags tend to be cheaper to construct because the grades required are discontinuous. Civil engineers can generally find a series of shorter segments going back and forth up the side of a hill more easily and with less grading than they for continuous grade, which must contend with the larger-scale geography of the hills to be surmounted.

== Disadvantages ==
Zig zags suffer from a number of limitations:

- The length of trains is limited to what will fit on the shortest stub track in the zig zag. For that reason, the Lithgow Zig Zag's stubs were extended at great expense in 1908. Even then, delays were such that the zig zag had eventually to be bypassed by a new route, which opened two years later.
- Reversing a locomotive-hauled train not purposely equipped for push-pull operation without first running the engine around to the rear of the train can be hazardous; however, operating the train with two locomotives, one at each end (a practice known as "topping-and-tailing"), can mitigate the dangers.
- The need to stop the train after each segment, throw the switch, and reverse means that progress through the zig zag is slow.
- Passenger cars with transverse seating force riders to travel in reverse for at least part of the journey though that issue is largely solved by longitudinal seating on cars serving such routes.

== Hazards ==
If the wagons in a freight train are marshaled poorly, with a light vehicle located between heavier ones (particularly with buffer couplings), the move on the middle road of a zig zag can cause derailment of the light wagon.

== Examples ==
- Argentina
  - Tren a las Nubes (1921)
- Australia
  - Lithgow Zig Zag, New South Wales (1869–1910) preserved – see Zig Zag Railway
  - Out of use:
    - Kalamunda Zig Zag, Western Australia – two reversals (dismantled)
    - Lake Margaret Tram, Tasmania, 610 mm (2 ft) (dismantled)
    - Lapstone Zig Zag, New South Wales – two reversals (1865) (dismantled)
    - Mundaring Weir branch railway, Western Australia (dismantled)
    - Thornleigh Zig Zag, New South Wales (dismantled)
    - Yarloop, Western Australia (dismantled)
    - Yarraglen (dismantled)
- Chile
  - Pisagua – Three reversals; long out of use but earthworks easy to trace
- China
  - Mifengyan on the Jiayang Coal Railway 762 mm (2 ft 6 in) – one reversal
  - Qinglongqiao on the Jingbao Railway
- Czech Republic
  - Dubí – local railway between Moldava and Most (Most–Moldava railway), trains have to change direction in Dubí station to continue further. Only one half of a 'Z' is placed
- Denmark
  - Lemvig – Small side track from the harbor to the railway station, used only on special occasions. In reality, only half a 'Z' as only one reversal is needed.
- Ecuador
  - Sibambe on the Quito-Guayaquil line (cf. Empresa de Ferrocarriles Ecuatorianos)
- France
  - Froissy Dompierre Light Railway
- Germany
  - In use:
    - Rauenstein (Hinterland Railway)
    - Lauscha (Sonneberg – Probstzella railway)
    - Lüttmoorsiel-Nordstrandischmoor island railway
    - Michaelstein (Rübeland Railway)
    - Rennsteig (Rennsteig Railway, Ilmenau – Themar)
    - Wurzbach (Saalfeld – Blankenstein railway)
  - Out of use
    - Lenzkirch in the Black Forest (dismantled)
    - Mainspitze station in Frankfurt am Main, used from 1846–1848 to reach the provisional Frankfurt terminal of the Main-Neckar Railway (dismantled)
    - Schillingsfürst (dismantled)
    - Elm (replaced in 1914 by Distelrasen Tunnel, but the structure is conserved within the Frankfurt-Fulda and Fulda-Gemünden railways and the connecting curve between the stations at Elm and Schlüchtern
    - Steinhelle-Medebach railway (double zig zag)
- Hungary
  - The Szob-Nagybörzsöny forest railway has a simple zig zag at the middle of the railway line between Kisirtás and Tolmács-hegy stations, with a loop in the middle of the Z shape
- India
  - Darjeeling Himalayan Railway has six full zig zags and three spirals. Most are from the construction of the current railway, but one was added in the 1940s, and at least one other was used temporarily following storm damage
  - Matheran Hill Railway has three zig zags
- Indonesia
  - Cikampek–Padalarang railway line Dutch East Indies made this line to shorten the travel time between the two biggest cities Jakarta and Bandung
  - Soekarno-Hatta Airport Commuter Line at Duri railway station.
- Ireland
  - The Limerick–Tralee railway line had a switchback at Newcastle West.
  - All trains on the Dublin–Waterford railway line had to switchback at Kilkenny until the opening of the Lavistown loop line in 1996.
- Italy
  - Ferrovia Genova-Casella has one zig zag currently in regular use at Casella Deposito (actually a single reversal)
  - Cecina-Volterra railway (this section of the line was closed in 1958)
  - the Menaggio–Porlezza railway had a single reversal near Menaggio
- Japan
  - Akita Shinkansen at Ōmagari Station
  - Haiki Station for the Midori Limited Express
  - Hakone Tozan Line has three zig zags, namely at Deyama S.B., Ōhiradai Station, Kami-Ōhiradai S.B.
  - Hisatsu Line at Okoba and Masaki stations
  - Hōhi Main Line at Tateno Station
  - Kisuki Line at Izumo-Sakane Station
  - Keikyu Main Line at Keikyū Kamata Station for trains operating direct service between Yokohama Station and Haneda Airport: This switchback exists purely from an operational standpoint and is not influenced by terrain obstacles.
  - Maibara Station for the Shirasagi Limited Express
  - Seibu Ikebukuro Line at Hannō Station for trains operating to and from Seibu-Chichibu Station
  - Shinonoi Line Obasute Station in Chikuma, Nagano, is on a switchback
  - The Tateyama Sabō Erosion Control Works Service Train (not publicly accessible) is notable for operating on a line with 38 zig zags, 18 of them in a row
  - Odakyū Enoshima Line at Fujisawa Station
- Mexico
  - Ferrocarril Noroeste de México, between Juan Mata Ortiz to Chico
- Myanmar
  - Passenger line between Thazi and Kalaw, with four switchbacks; still in use
  - Passenger line between Mandalay and Lashio
- New Zealand
  - Driving Creek Railway, Coromandel
  - Western Line, Auckland. Service ran from Britomart to Newmarket before reversing to run to Swanson. The reverse could have been avoided, but that would bypass Newmarket, which is a major station. In 2026, the switchback ceased operating as the opening of the City Rail Link was packaged with changes to the route of the Western Line (now the East West Line).
- North Korea
  - Kanggye Line, between Hwangp'o and Simrip'yŏng stations
  - Kŭmgangsan Electric Railway, between Tanballyŏng and Malhwiri (Kŭmganggu) stations. Entire line destroyed during the Korean War and not rebuilt
  - Paengmu Line, between Yugok and Rajŏk stations, and at Samyu station (station is located on a single reverse)
  - in addition, there are numerous switchbacks on spurs into underground facilities located off main lines.
- Pakistan
  - Khyber Pass Railway
- Peru
  - PeruRail between Cuzco to Machu Picchu – Five switchbacks
  - Seven full Zigzags and one single reverse on the Central Railway of Peru
- Slovakia
  - Historical Logging Switchback Railway in Vychylovka – Five switchback s
- South Africa
  - Tierkrans Switchback Railway, between Barkley East station and Aliwal-North station. For economic reasonsm regular service was finally discontinued in 1991. Railway enthusiasts also know the line for the famous set of eight reverses.
- South Korea
  - Yeongdong Line, between Heungjeon station and Nahanjeong station. This section closed in 2012 and replaced by Solan tunnel
- Sweden
  - Lövsjöväxeln (Lövsjö points) on Hällefors-Fredriksbergs Järnvägar (1875–1940)
  - Visby harbour från Visby station, 32 meters of difference, (1868–1962),
- Switzerland
  - Chambrelien station on the Neuchâtel–Le Locle-Col-des-Roches line. Before electrification, a turntable was required to allow large tender locomotives to be turned as they ran around their trains
  - Combe-Tabeillon station on the Saignelégier-Glovelier line
  - Grindelwald Grund railway station
  - trains on each of the three narrow gauge lines out of Aigle have to reverse somewhere en route (Aigle–Leysin, Aigle–Sépey–Diablerets, Aigle–Ollon–Monthey–Champéry)
- Taiwan
  - Alishan Forest Railway
- United Kingdom
  - Cheddleton – St Edwards Hospital tramway reversed twice in order to gain height from Leekbrook Station to the hospital itself.
  - Spittal, Northumberland – The former mineral branch to Tweed Dock required two reversals to descend 20 m from the East Coast Main Line to near sea level.
  - Battersby railway station has been a switchback since the closure of the line to Stokesley in 1965.
  - The Marlow branch line operates as a switchback, with the driver changing ends at Bourne End railway station to reach Marlow railway station.
  - Coombe Junction Halt operates a switchback on the line to Looe in Cornwall.
- United States
  - Amtrak, Chicago, Illinois – The City of New Orleans and the Illini and Saluki trains depart Chicago Union Station backwards to utilize a switchback that connects Union Station to the former Illinois Central main line (now owned by CN).
  - Buckingham Branch Railroad – One switchback at New Canton, Virginia
  - Eight switchbacks at Cascade on GN – Replaced by tunnel which was in turn replaced by a longer tunnel
  - Cass Scenic Railroad, West Virginia – Two switchbacks with 11% grade between, still in use
  - Colorado and Southern Railway, Central City, Colorado – Two switchbacks on the ascent from Black Hawk, Colorado to Central City
  - Confusion Hill Mountain Train Ride, Piercy, California – Several switchbacks in use
  - Crown King Branch, Bradshaw Mountain Railroad, Yavapai County, Arizona – 10 switchbacks were utilized on the line between Mayer, Arizona and Crown King, Arizona.
  - Fern Rock Transportation Center, Fern Rock, Philadelphia – One switchback, connects the Broad Street Line with SEPTA Regional Rail, still in limited use
  - Hagans Switchback in Virginia – Still in use by CSX for Coal trains
  - Industrial switchback, Montage Mountain Road, Scranton, Pennsylvania – Still in use
  - Market Street Railway 33 18th and Park streetcar, San Francisco, California – One switchback, route converted to trolleybus but still largely following original alignment with a very sharp turn at the former switchback
  - Monarch Branch, Denver and Rio Grande Western Railroad, Colorado – Two switchbacks
  - Morenci Southern Railroad - Two switchbacks abandoned in 1922.
  - Mount Hood Railroad, Hood River, Oregon – One switchback, still in use
  - Northern Pacific's Coeur d'Alene Branch, Lookout Pass – One switchback east of Mullan, Idaho along its 4% descent towards Wallace
  - Roaring Camp and Big Trees Narrow Gauge Railroad, Felton, California – One switchback bypassing a spiral trestle destroyed by fire in 1976; still in use
  - Shasta Sunset Dinner Train, McCloud, California – One switchback, "Signal Butte Switchback", line out of service since 2010
  - Sierra Railway, Melones, California – Two switchbacks, abandoned, used by SRY's Angels Branch to cross Stanislaus River Canyon, one switchback inundated by New Melones Lake
