= Dampf-Kleinbahn Mühlenstroth =

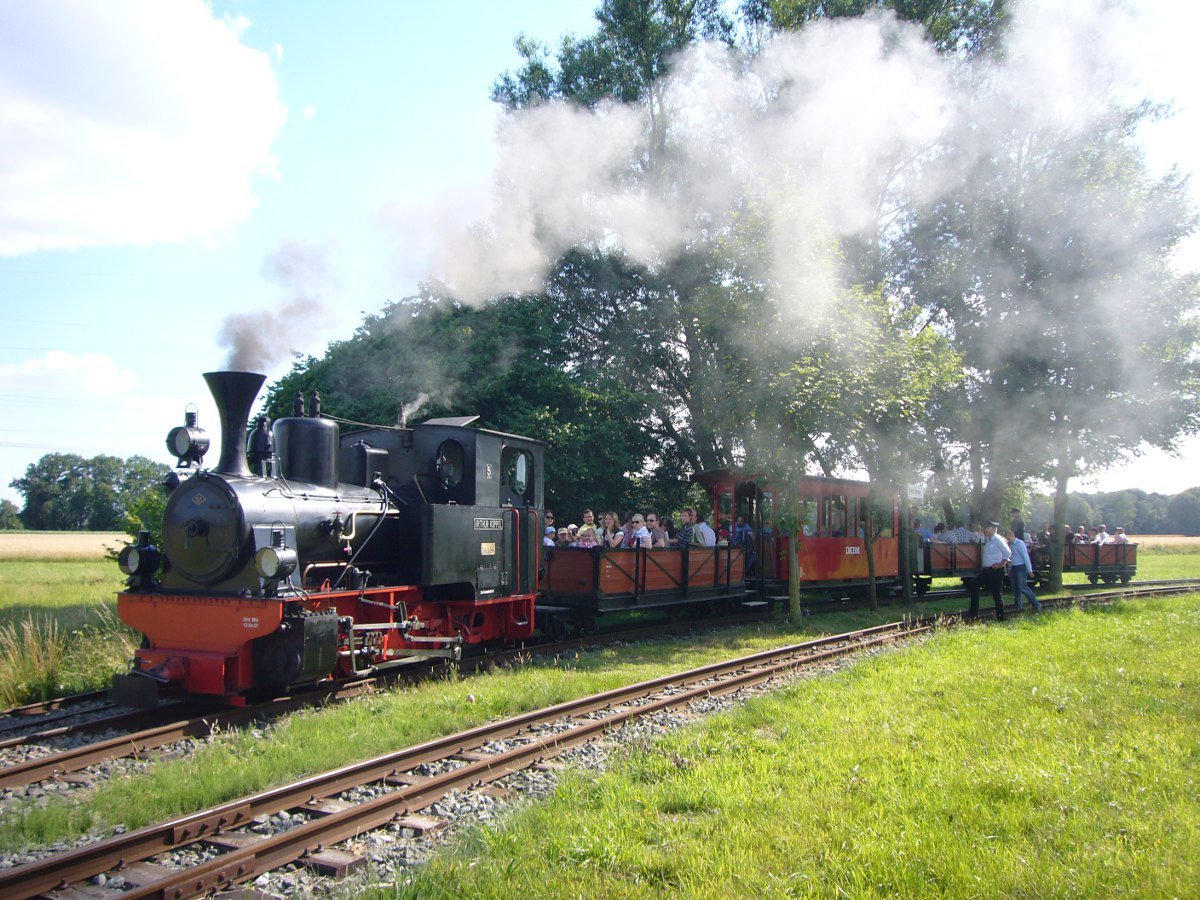
- No.5 with passenger train at "Röhdelheim"

Overview
- Locale: Gütersloh, North Rhine-Westphalia, Germany
- Dates of operation: 1973–current

Technical
- Track gauge: 600 mm (1 ft 11 5/8 in)
- Length: 1.5km

Other
- Website: http://www.dkbm.de

The Dampf-Kleinbahn Mühlenstroth (DKBM) is a voluntarily run 600mm narrow gauge steam railway in Gütersloh, Germany. The railway was opened in 1973 to be able to present the corresponding associations collection of vintage narrow gauge railway vehicles to the public. It consists of approximately 1.5 km of track that is set up to allow different types of operations.

== History ==
In 1971 a group of narrow gauge railway enthusiasts purchased a small 0-4-0 750mm gauged steam locomotive from a scrap merchant with the aim of running it on the Zillertal Railway in Austria. However when nearing completion of the locomotives restoration in Mülheim an der Ruhr the situation at the Zillertal Railway changed, eliminating the need for this locomotive. Thus a fellow enthusiast from Gütersloh allowed the locomotives owners to construct a railway on the grounds of his inn to be able to run the Locomotive. Because of the comparatively small size of the piece of land the Locomotive was regauged to 600mm to allow tighter curves to be used on the railway. It so comes that in 1972 the "Dampf-Kleinbahn Mühlenstroth e.V." a registered charitable association was founded to own and run the new Railway. Operations commenced on June the 10th 1973 having constructed the entire railway including three coaches from scratch. The railway has run every year since, while the rolling stock collection has grown considerably.

== The collection ==
The railways rolling stock consists mainly of wagons and coaches formerly used at the "Muskau Forest Railway" (WEM) and the "Mecklenburg-Pomeranian Narrow Gauge Railway" (MPSB), both run by the former East German state railways, Deutsche Reichsbahn. They were either sourced directly from the WEM or via Berlins Children's Railway. The Locomotives include small industrial and larger light railway steam locomotives. The railway has also gathered an interesting collection of large diesel locomotives over the years. In the summer months the mainstay of coaches are of the open type used during the First World War by the German army and were last in use on the WEM. The closed passenger coaches consist of some self built vehicles and two former MPSB coaches, there are also two former MPSB guards vans.

=== Steam Locomotives ===
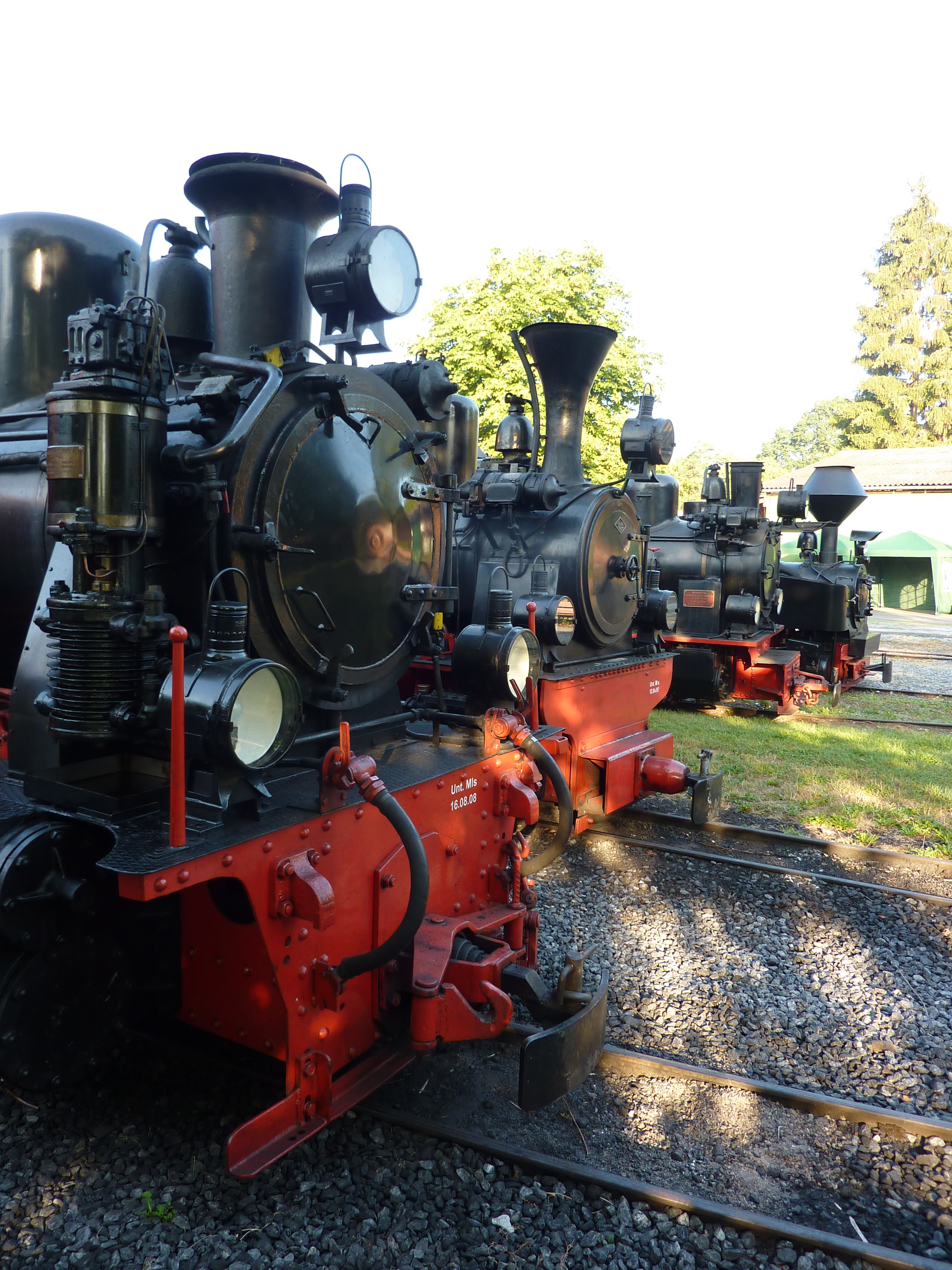
DKBM locos 4, 5, 7 and 3 (l to r) being prepared for the 45th anniversary gala 2018.

DKBM Number	Name	previous Numbers	Manufacturer	Model	Works No/Year	Type	Location	Status
1	Mölm	-	Hohenzollern	Fuchs	3643/1917	0-4-0WT	DKBM	stored
2	August Bentlage	-	Henschel	Riesa/B70	28470/1948	0-4-0WT	DKBM	stored
3	-	HF 2301; PKP 4243; K4-462; DR 99 3318-5	Borsig	Brigadelok	10364/1919	0-8-0T	DKBM	operational
4	Nicki+Frank S	HF 25982; ÖBB 798.101	Henschel	HF 110C	25982/1941	0-6-0	DKBM	awaiting repairs
5	Arthur Koppel	-	O&K	-	12805/1936	0-4-0WT	DKBM	stored
7	Gustav	T49 115	Chrzanow	Rys	1936/1949	0-4-0WT	DKBM	operational
8	Philipp S	-	Henschel	Fabia	12202/1913	0-4-0WT	DKBM	under overhaul
9	Francesca S	25325	Henschel	HF 110C	25325/1942	0-6-0T	DKBM	stored
10	Merapi	-	Hanomag	-	10409/1925	0-8-0T	Berlin	operational
11	Solvay	-	OberLok Krenau	-	777/1944	0-8-0	DKBM	under restoration
12	Mecklenburg	MPSB 12; DR 99 3462	O&K	-	12518/1934	0-8-0	DKBM	under overhaul

=== Diesel Locomotives ===
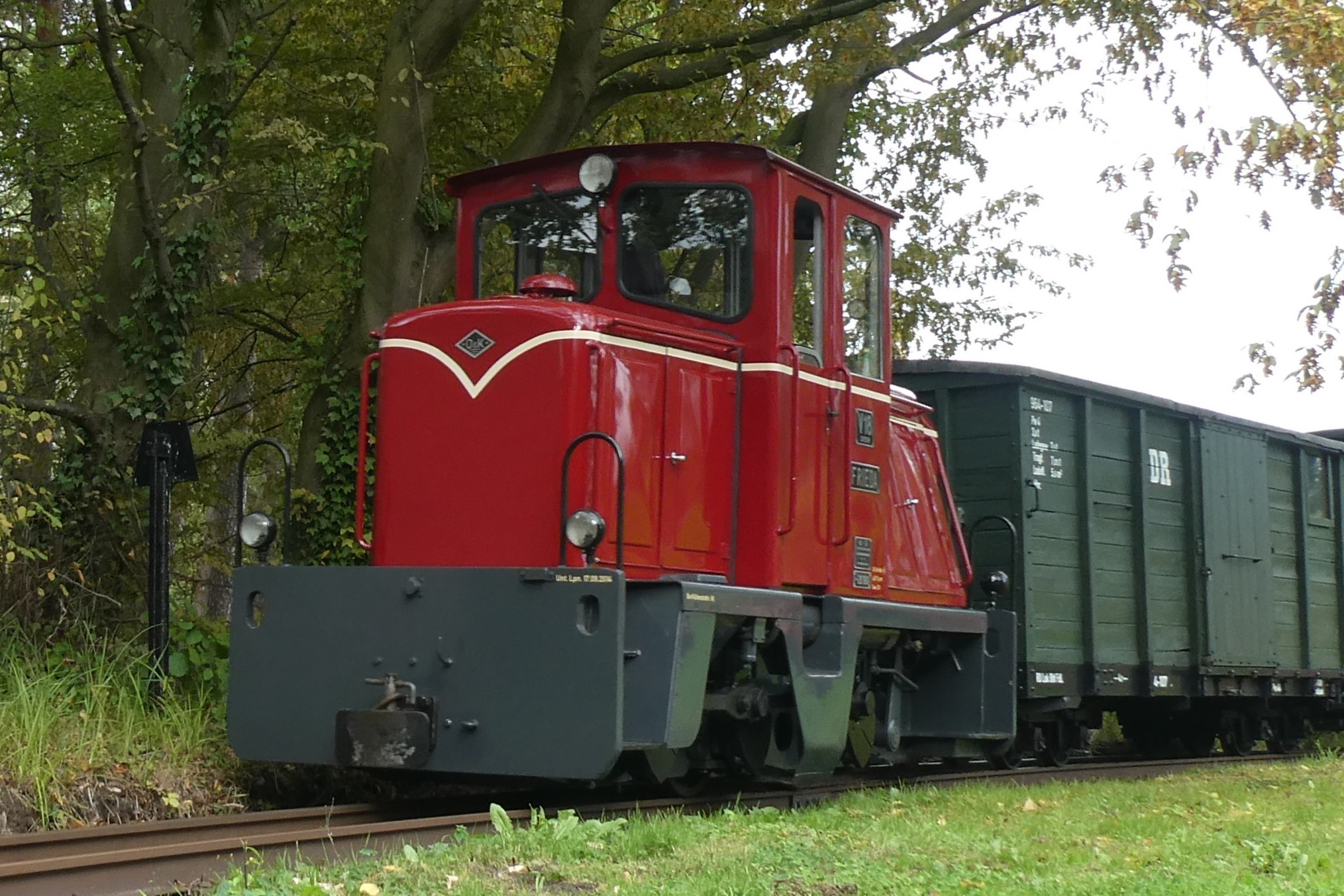
DKBM V18 "Frieda"

DKBM Number	Name	Manufacturer	Model	Transmission	Works No/Year	Location	Status
V13	Berolina	Deutz	Cöln	hydromechanical	23268/1939	DKBM	operational
V14	FuttFutt	LKM Babelsberg	Ns2f	mechanical	248631/1955	DKBM	operational
V15	Wilhelmine	Schöma	Lo 20	mechanical	734/1950	private site	operational
V16	Senne	Deutz	OMZ122F	mechanical	11583/1934	Rijssens Leemspoor	-
V17	Hammonia	Windhoff	HK130C	hydraulic	765/1943	DKBM	under overhaul
V18	Frieda	O&K	Mv8	hydraulic	26189/1962	DKBM	operational
V19	-	LKM Babelsberg	Ns2f	mechanical	262004/1958	DKBM	operational

== Operations ==
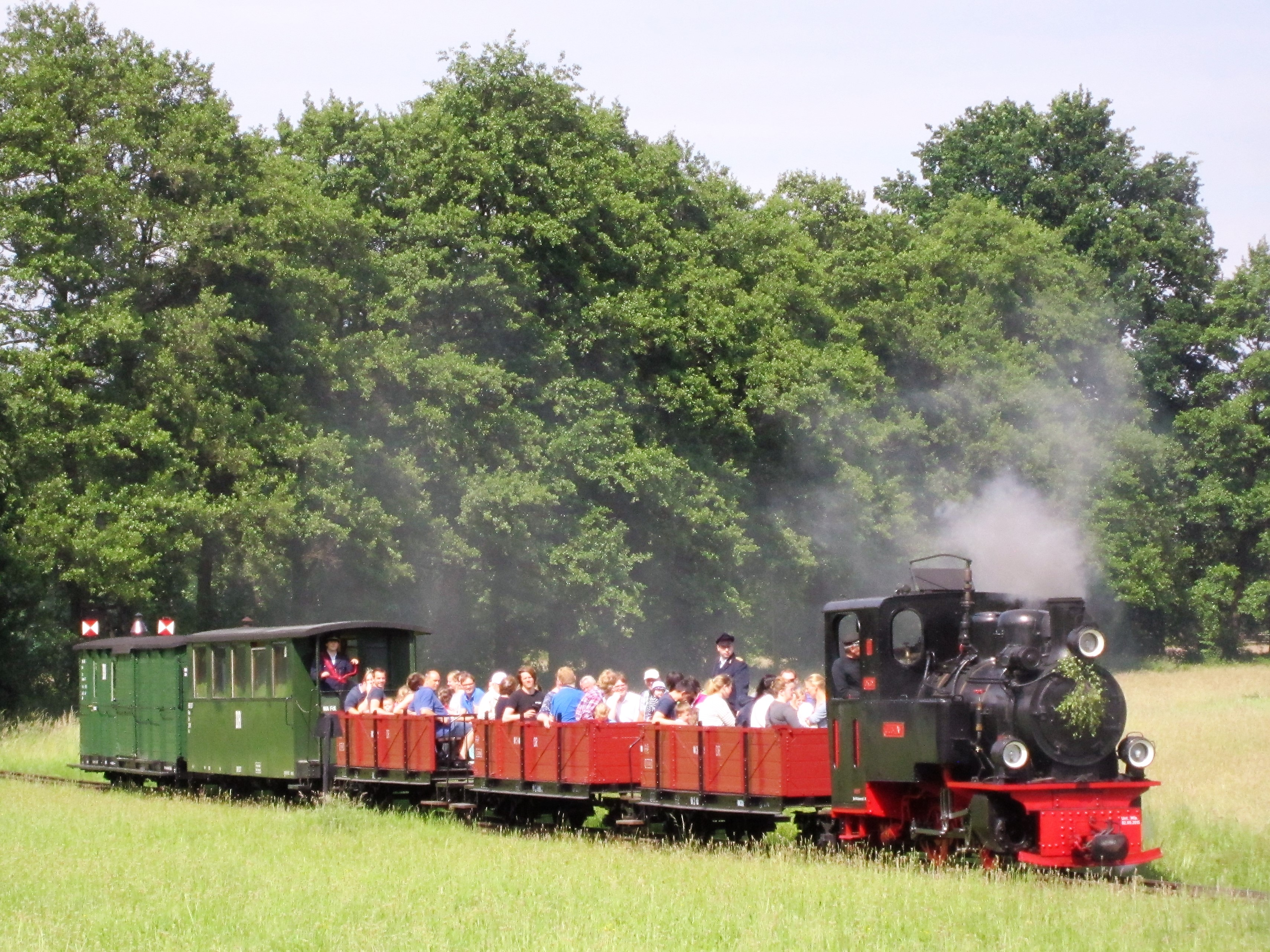
DKBM loco No.7 with a passenger train on its way to Rödelheim

Originally the train ran around the field on a simple circuit with only one station: "Postdamm". This was soon complemented by a second station, named "Rödelheim" on the opposite side to make two train operations possible. Then a third station called "Mühlenstroth Kleinbahnhof" was built next to the engine shed and workshop in the centre of the circuit and connected to it via a rail triangle.

Now an end to end service form "Mühlenstroth Klb" via "Rödelheim" to "Postdamm" with the locomotive running around its train at both ends was introduced. This is the standard procedure on normal running days. The operating season traditionally begins May 1 and ends on the last Sunday of September. However since 1992 the railway runs its "Nikolausfahrten" (Santa Specials) on selected weekends in December. The DKBM celebrates every 5th anniversary with a gala event which sees all operational locomotives in steam and sometimes features guest engines from other railways.

Since 2012 there is an annual special event called the "Kleinbahntage" on which the railway aims to recreate operations and scenes as they would have been experienced on a rural light railway in the 1950s and 1960s. This sees trains running from "Mühlenstroth Kleinbahnhof" to "Mühlenstroth Kleinbahnhof" via "Rödelheim" and "Postdamm" and back again, thus simulating an end to end line with two intermediate stops.

In the years 2020 and 2021 no public services were run due to the Covid-Pandemic. As "Mühlenstroth Kleinbahnhof" is currently being rebuilt operations resumed in 2022, 2023 and 2024 running on the original circuit again.The progress with the stations rebuild allowed operations to revert back to the pre Covid end to end format for the 2025 running season.

== Other railways ==
The DKBM maintains friendly relations with other steam railways such as the "Berlin Park Railway" (ex Berlin Children's Railway) and the WEM. This includes the exchange of personnel and guest locomotives both long and short term.

== Literature ==
- Dampf-Kleinbahn Mühlenstroth e.V.: Von der Hobby-Eisenbahn zur Museumseisenbahn. 40 Jahre Dampf-Kleinbahn Mühlenstroth. Gütersloh 2014
