= Lüttmoorsiel-Nordstrandischmoor island railway =

German narrow gauge island railway

Coordinates: 54.5497°N 8.8274°E

Lüttmoorsiel–Nordstrandischmoor
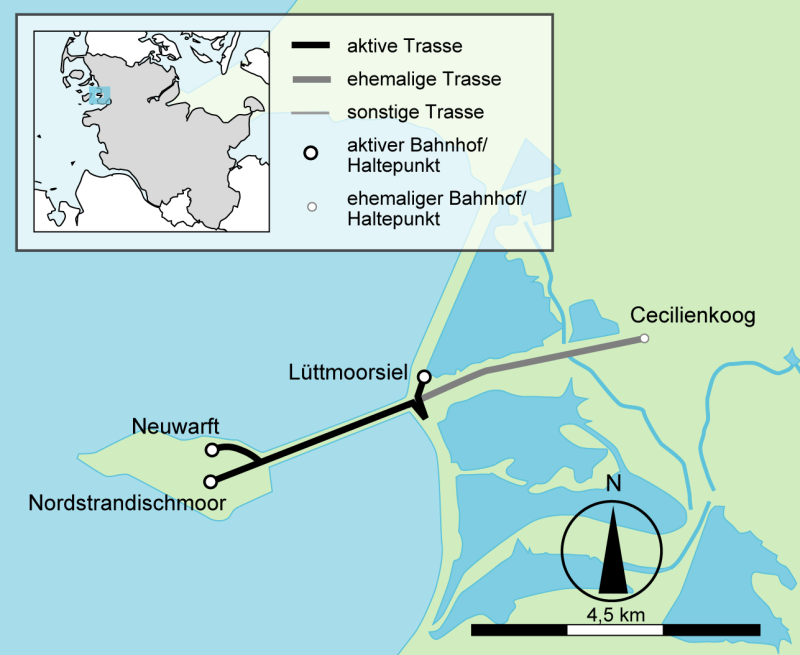

Technical
- Line length: 3.5 km (2.2 mi)
- Track gauge: 600 mm (1 ft 11 5/8 in)

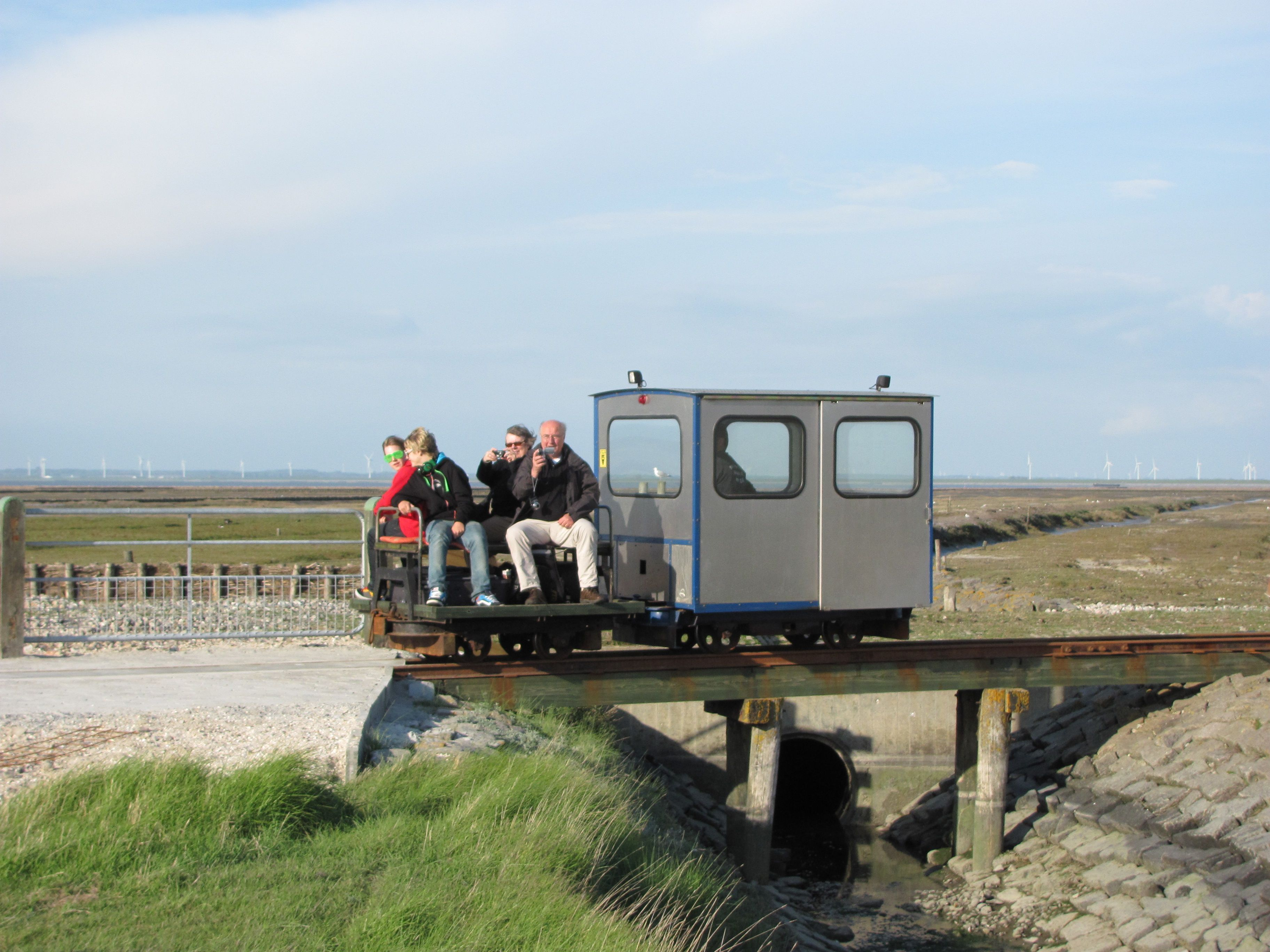
Train on the only bridge on the line

The Lüttmoorsiel-Nordstrandischmoor island railway (German: Halligbahn Lüttmoorsiel–Nordstrandischmoor), also called the Loren Railway (Lorenbahn, a general term for this type of railroad in the Frisian Islands), is a German 600 mm (1 ft 11 5/8 in) narrow gauge island railway through the North Frisian Wadden Sea from Beltringharder Koog on the mainland to the small undyked tidal island, or Hallig, of Nordstrandischmoor.

== Legal status ==
The line is a piece of non-public railway infrastructure owned by the state of Schleswig-Holstein and operated by the State Department for Coastal Protection, National Parks and Marine Conservation (Landesbetrieb für Küstenschutz, Nationalpark und Meeresschutz) or LKN-SH – formerly the Office for Rural Regions (Amt für ländliche Räume).

== History ==
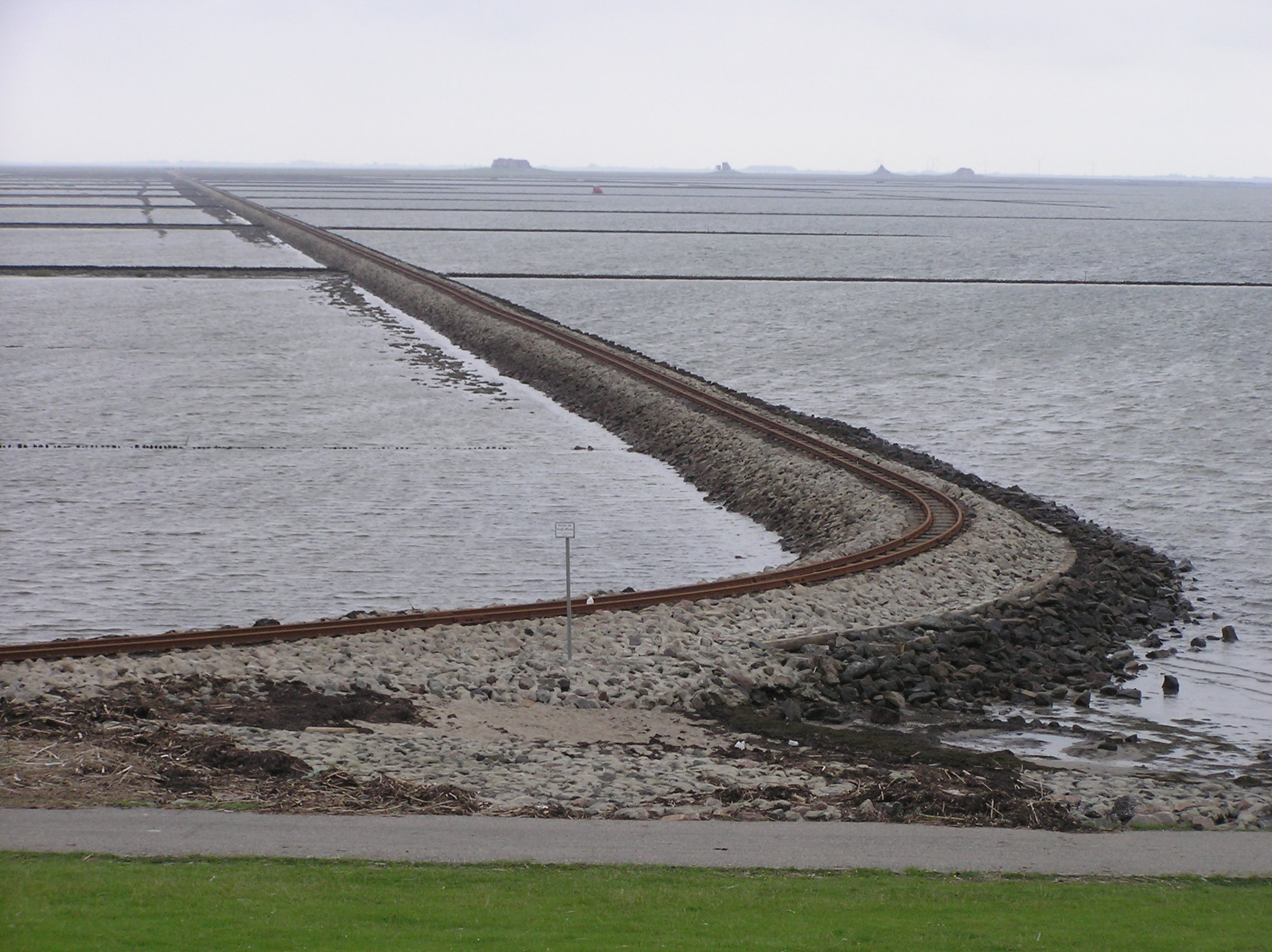
View of the Lorendamm

The 600 mm (1 ft 11 5/8 in) narrow-gauge railway was built in 1933/1934 from Cecilienkoog over a pile-supported embankment to Nordstrandischmoor in order to transport construction material for the sea defences of the island. Its length was 7 km (4.3 mi). On 1 March 1956 the line was destroyed by ice floes, but later rebuilt. In 1977 the pile dam was filled with rubble to make the line more stable. In 1988, after a new outer dyke around the Beltringharder Koog was completed, the section of track between Cecilienkoog and the new dyke was replaced by a roadway. The rest of the line is still in operation and now has a route length of 3.6 km (2.2 mi). In 2000, a new, paved Lorendamm embankment was built, which can now be crossed largely independently of the tide table and is impassable only when there is a storm surge.

== Infrastructure ==
The main storage depot for the railway is behind the new outer dyke. The railway climbs over the dyke via a switchback, the train climbs the embankment on one side, then the points are switched, and subsequently, the train descends the embankment on the other side in the opposite direction. It follows the embankment for about 3 km (1.9 mi) of its length. In the middle there is another siding. On the island, the route branches to Nordstrandischmoor station and Neuwarft, which is the only one of the four warfs on the island of Nordstrandischmoor with its own railway link.

== Rolling stock ==
Some of the stock belongs to the State Department for Coastal Defence and National Parks. There are two locomotives, goods wagons for construction work and two construction wagons (Bauwagen), which provide shelter for the workers during construction work.

The other vehicles belong to the residents of Nordstrandischmoor. Each household has its own wagon. These are draisines, each powered by an internal combustion engine, some with a trailer. Initially, the trucks had sails and were powered by wind. These vehicles are for the personal use of the islanders and their guests. There is no commercial traffic. Drivers must be at least 15 years old and hold a moped licence.

The locals refer to this railway as the Lorenbahn. The word Lore refers to any one of the rolling stock that run on the line. This usage differs from the usual meaning of the German railway term Lore or Güterlore, which refers only to a tipper wagon.

== Gallery ==
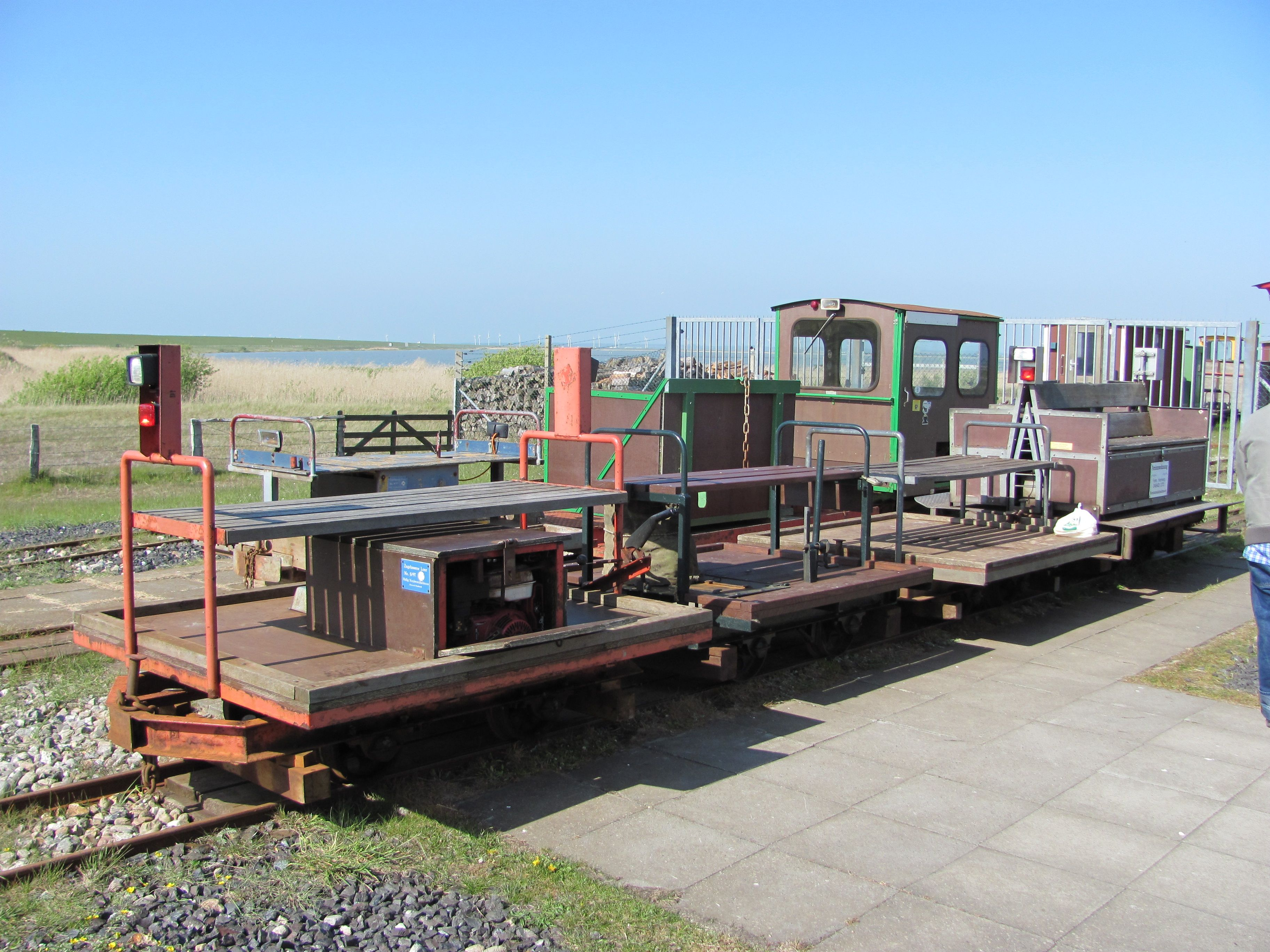
Vehicle park on the mainland

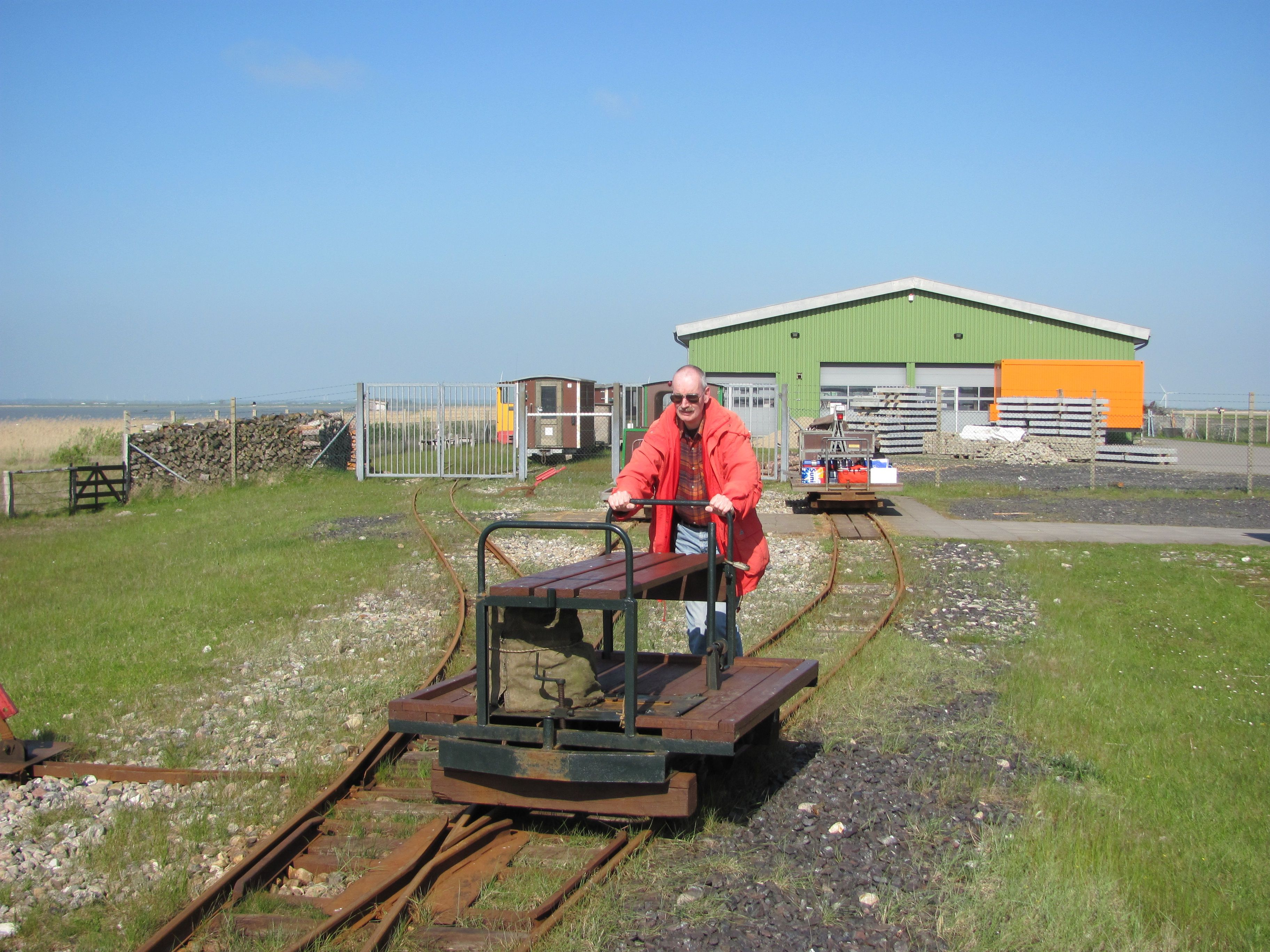
Shunting operations

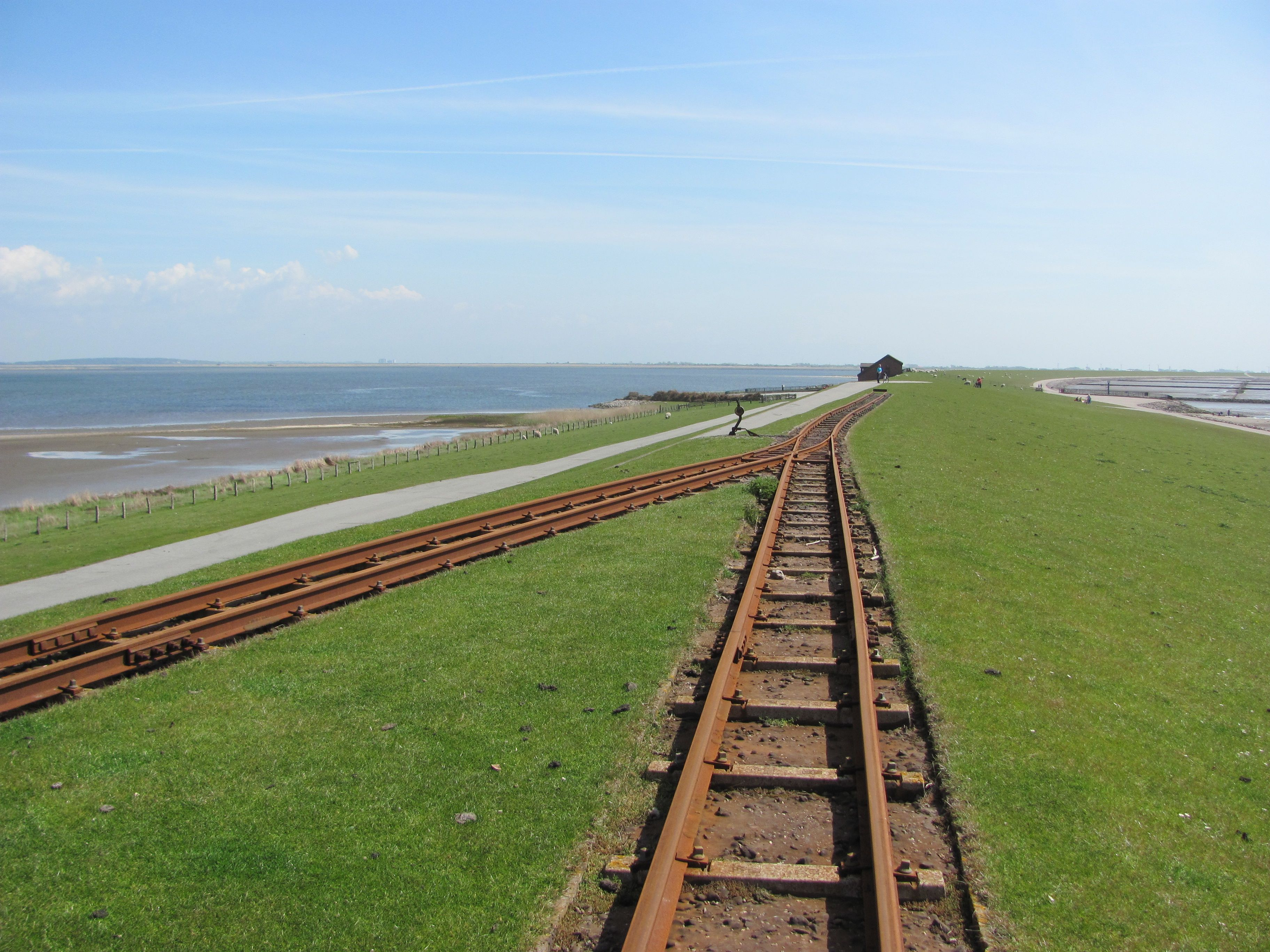
Switchback on the crest of the dyke

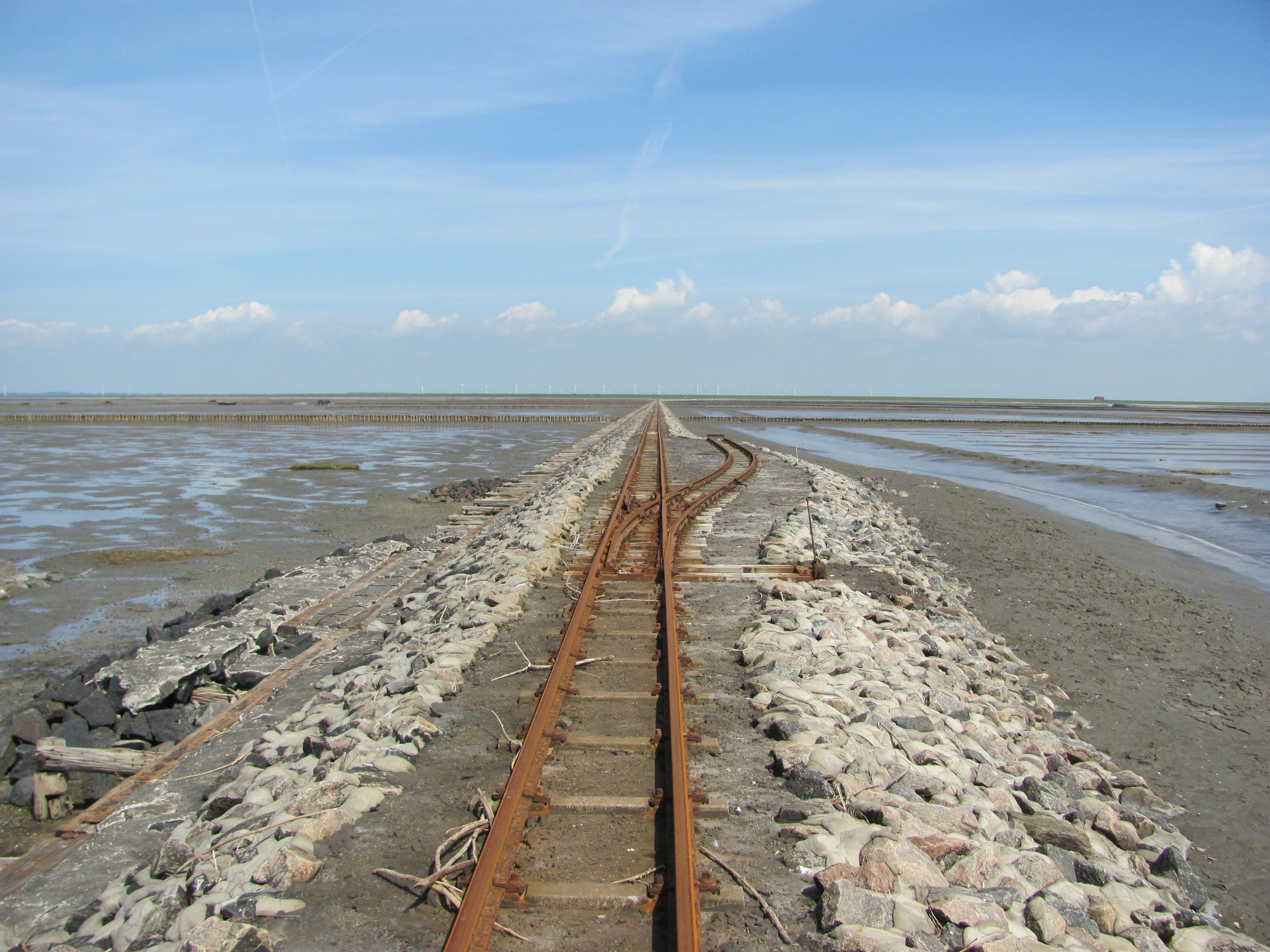
Siding half-way along the embankment

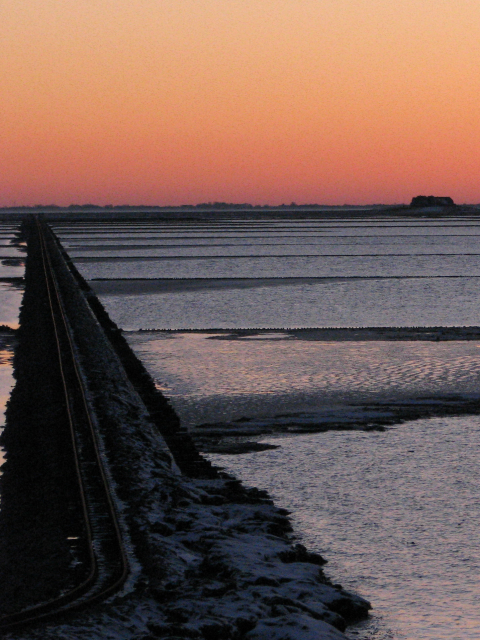
The Lorendamm against the evening sky. Right: the Neuwarft.

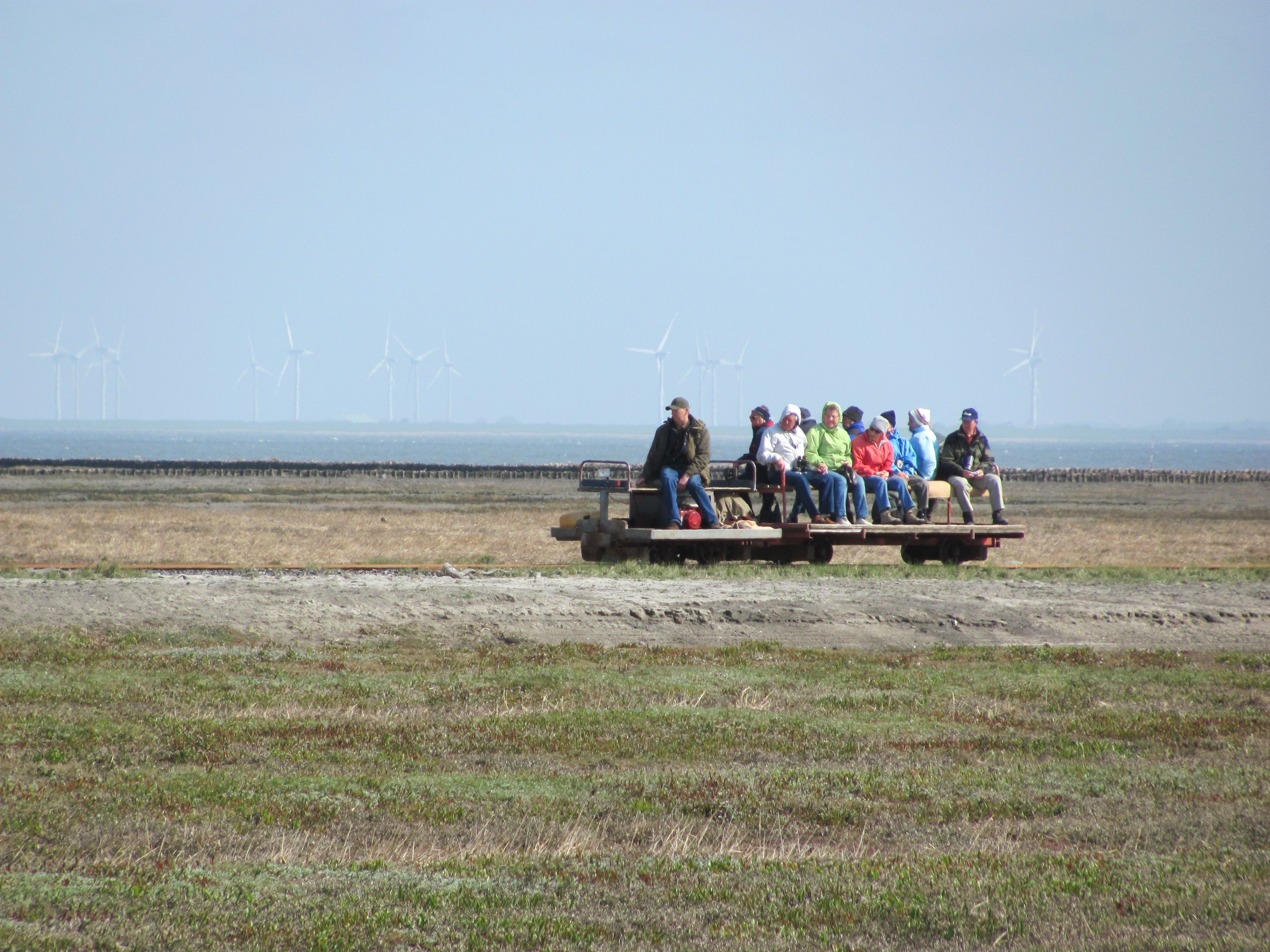
A "passenger train"

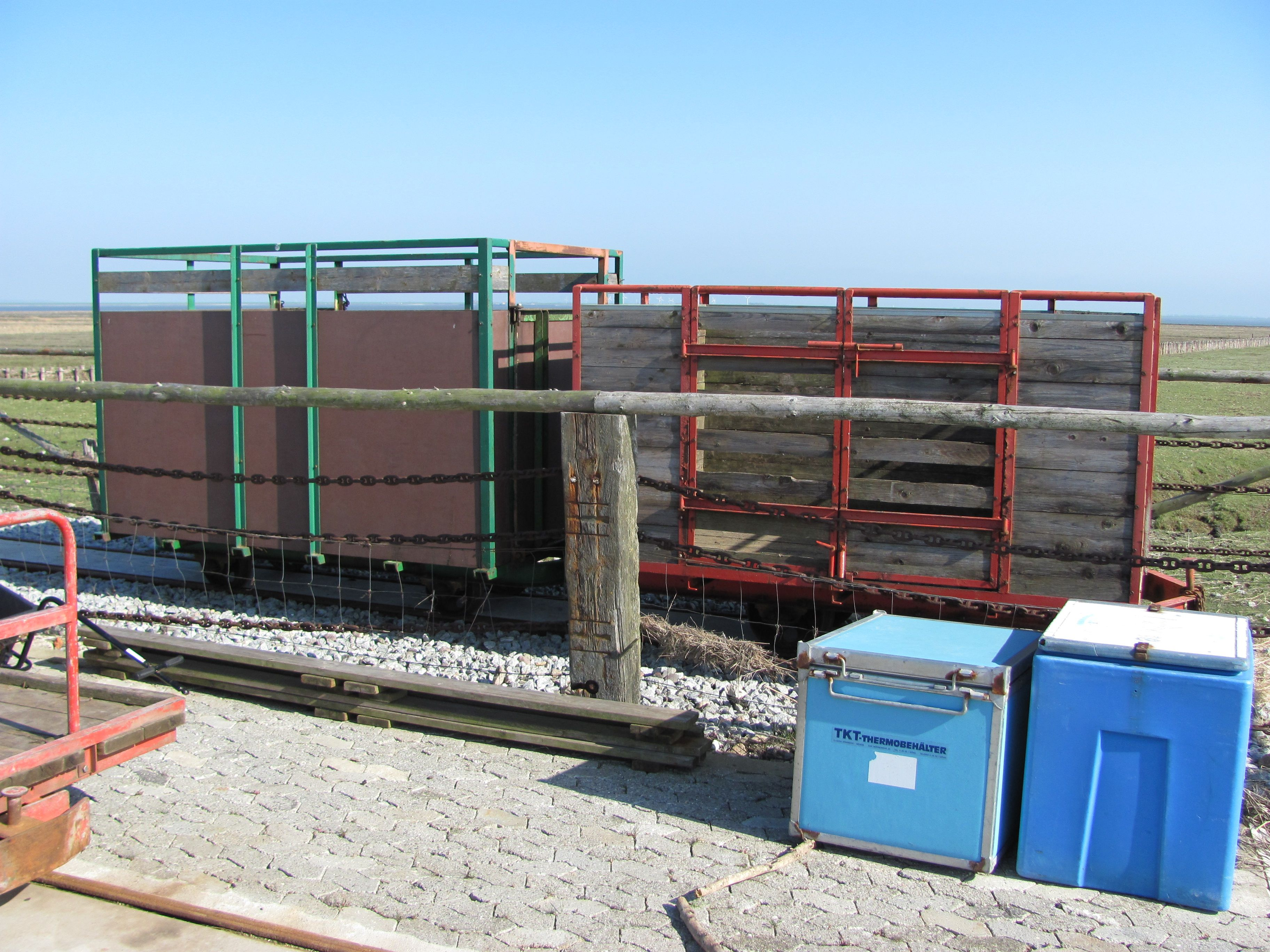
Cattle wagons

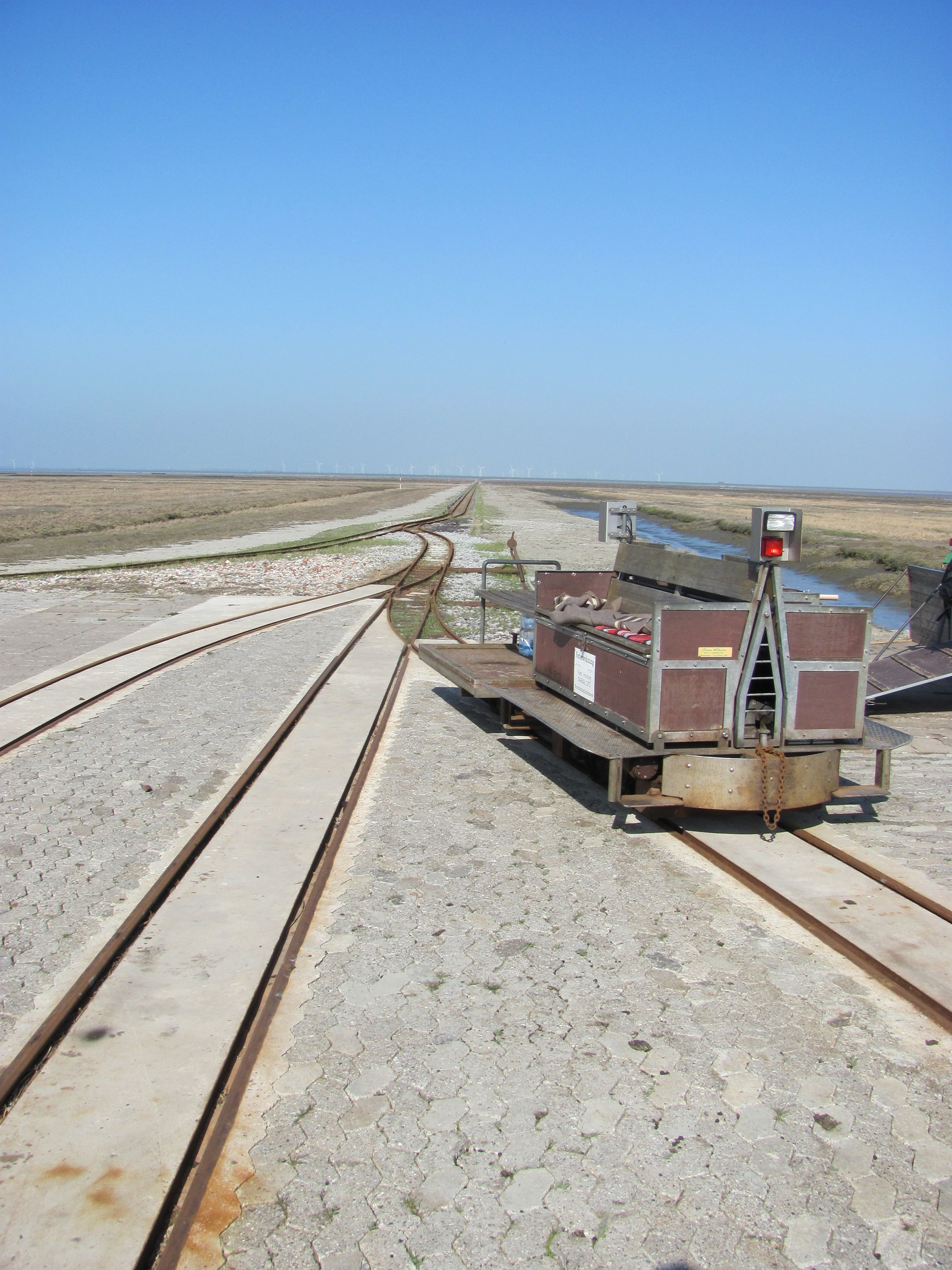
Nordstrandischmoor island station

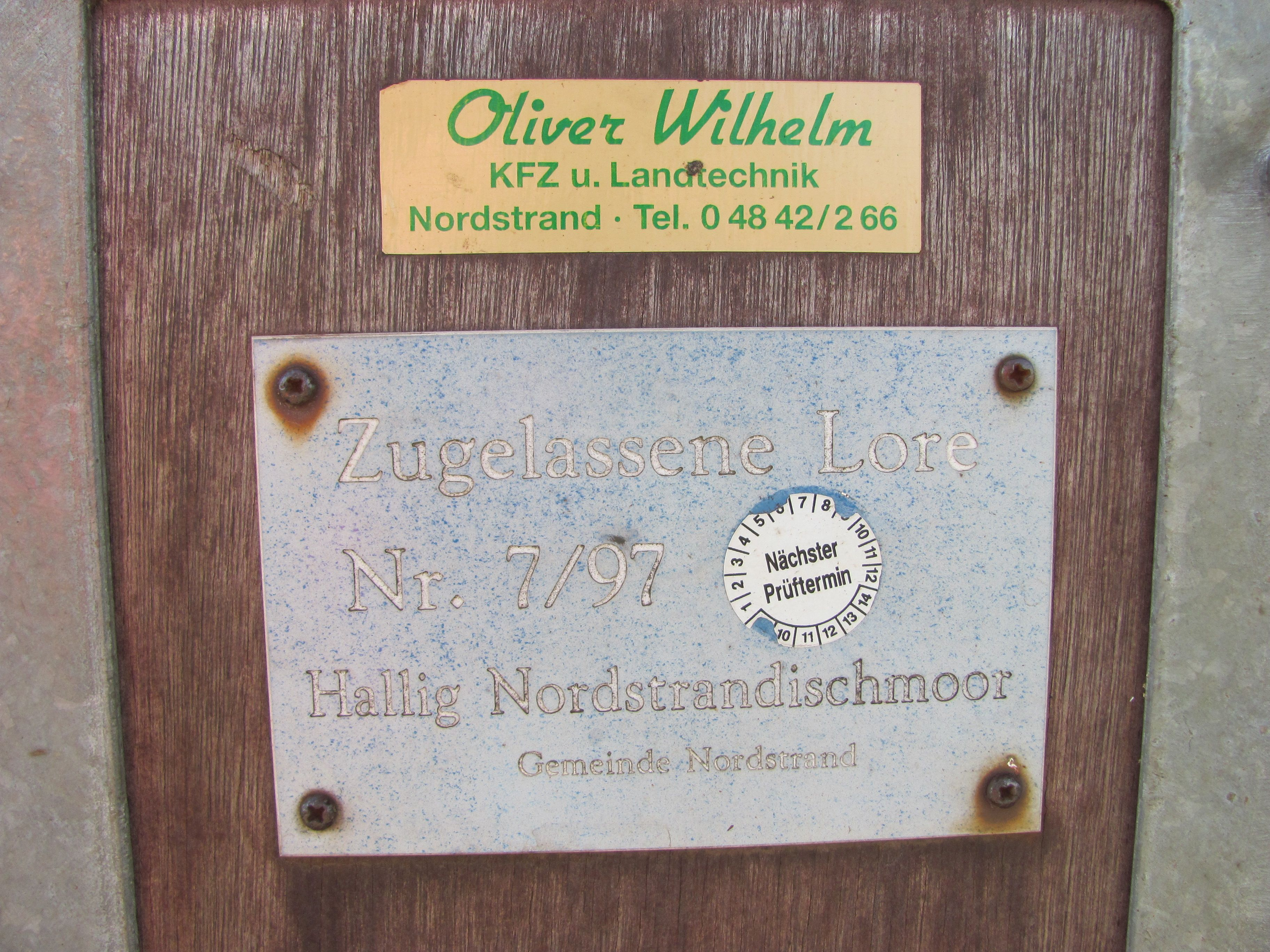
TÜV certificate for a locomotive

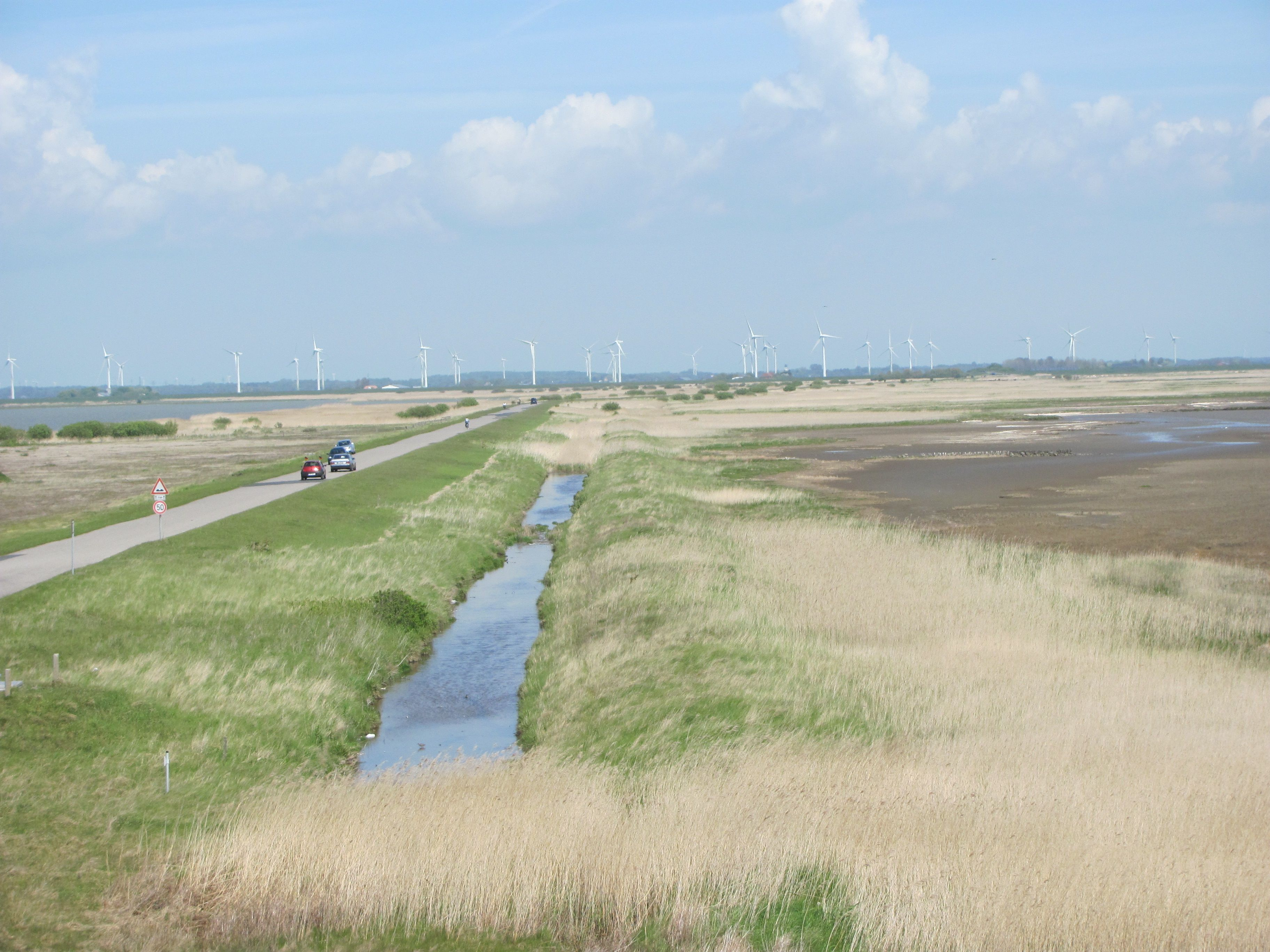
Old track between Cecilien Koog and Lüttmoorsiel (the old embankment is right of the channel).

== Sources ==
- Petersen, Marcus (1981). Die Halligen. Küstenschutz – Sanierung – Naturschutz. Neumünster. ISBN 3-529-06174-3
- Rogl, Hans Wolfgang (1996). Die Nordsee-Inselbahnen. 6. Auflage, alba, Düsseldorf, ISBN 3-87094-230-4
