= Heeresfeldbahnlokomotive =

A Heeresfeldbahnlokomotive is the German term for a special wartime locomotive (Kriegslokomotive) for employment on military field railways (Heeresfeldbahnen), railways usually designed to transport military supplies to the front line.

== Classes ==
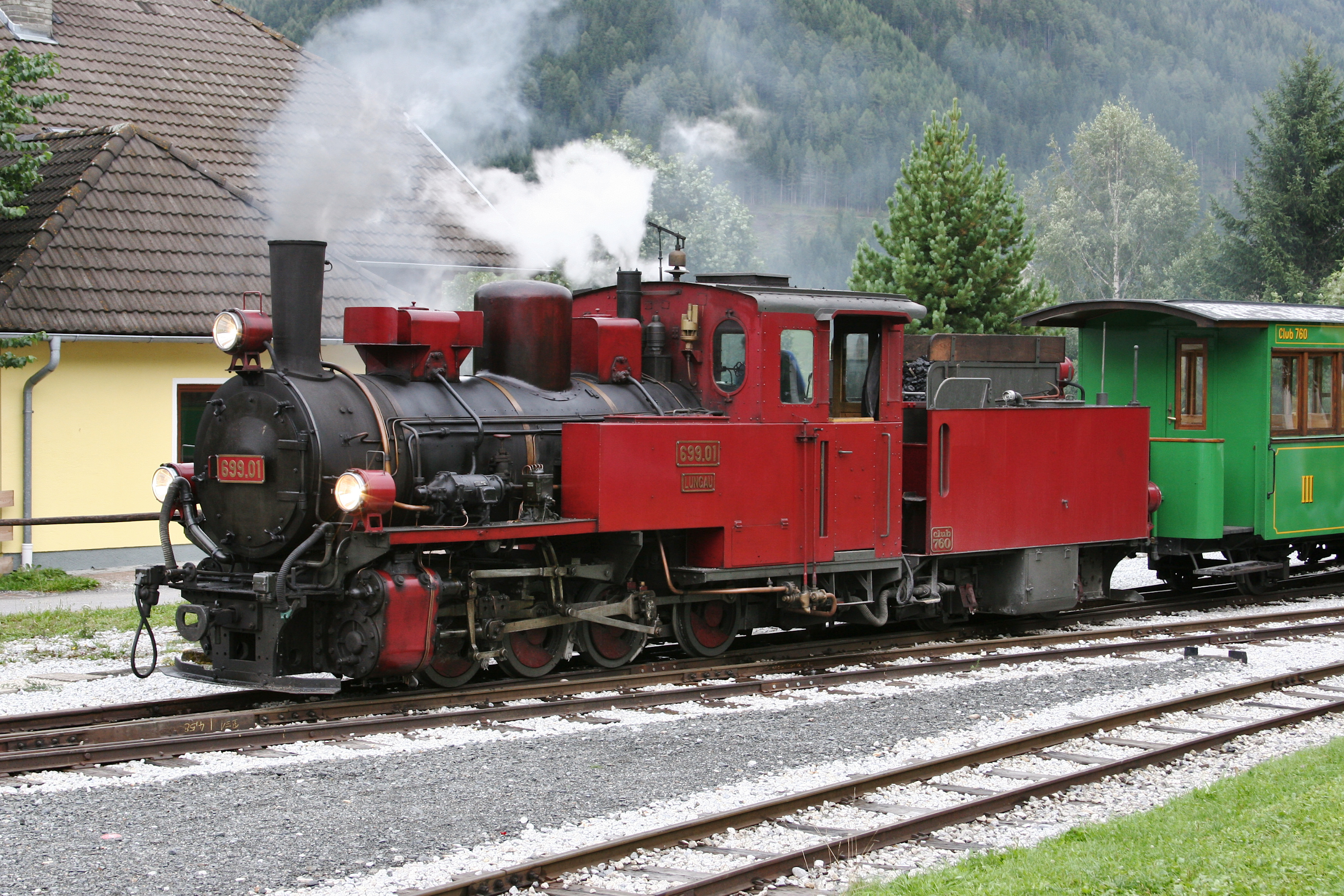
HF 160 D

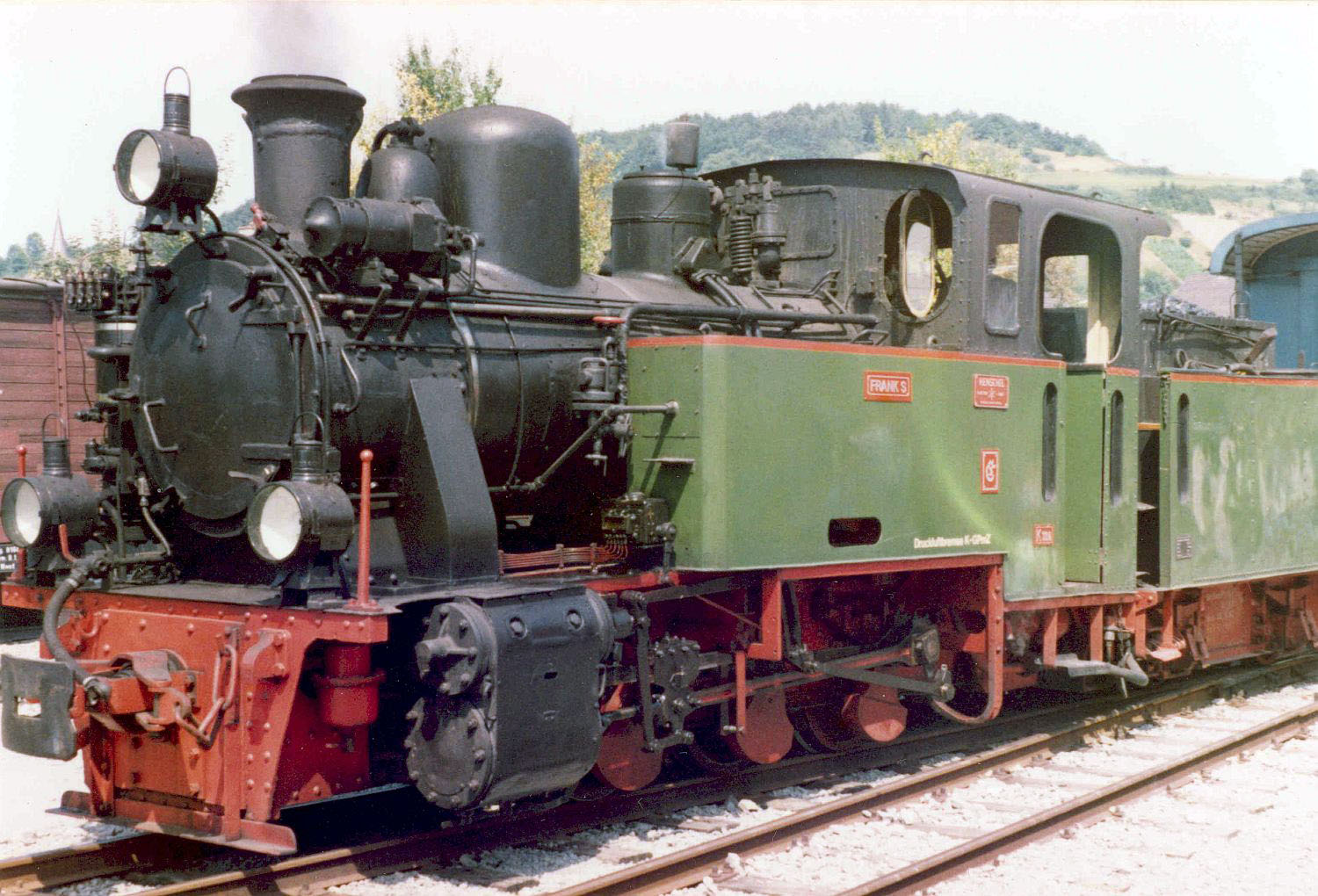
HF 110 C

=== Germany ===
==== Steam locomotives World War I ====
- Zwilling
- Brigadelokomotive

==== Steam locomotives World War II ====
(KDL = Kriegsdampflokomotive)

- HF 70 C (KDL 12)
- HF 110 C
- HF 160 D (KDL 11)
- HF 210 E

==== Diesel locomotives World War II ====
(KML = Kriegsmotorlokomotive)

- HF 200 D
- HF 130 C (KML 3)
- HF 50 B (KML 4)
- HF 40 B (Industrie class Deutz OMZ 122 F for bridging the gap whilst the HF 50 B was being designed)

== Preserved ==
German Heeresfeldbahnlokomotiven preserved in Germany after the Second World War:

=== in Germany ===
==== Steam locomotives ====
- HF 70 C (KDL 12)
- HF 110 C (JLKB Nos. 1, 4 and 5): Nicki + Frank S. (Slg. Seidensticker)
- HF 160 D (KDL 11)
- HF 210 E: Aquarius C (Slg. Seidensticker)

==== Diesel locomotives ====
- HF 200 D: none
- HF 130 C (KML 3)
- HF 50 B (KML 4)

=== in Austria ===
Many Heeresfeldbahnlokomotiven were left in Austria after the war; as a result many of these locomotives were used by Austrian railway companies.

==== Austrian Federal Railways (ÖBB) ====
===== Steam locomotives =====
- ÖBB Class 798 (HF 110 C)
- ÖBB Class 699, 699.1 (HF 160 D)

===== Diesel locomotives =====
- ÖBB Class 2092 (HF 130 C)

==== Salzkammergut-Lokalbahn (SKGLB) ====
===== Steam locomotives =====
- SKGLB 19 (HF 160 D)
- SKGLB 22 (HF 210 E)
- SKGLB 32 (HF 110 C)
- SKGLB 33 (HF 110 C)

===== Diesel locomotives =====
- SKGLB D 40 (HF 200 D)

=== in Poland ===
==== Diesel locomotives ====
- Lx 164 (HF 200 D, Sochaczew narrow gauge museum)

=== in Namibia ===
==== Steam locomotives ====
- Swakopmund-Windhuk Staatsbahn Zwillinge, Number 154A (154B is lost) on a plinth under a shelter outside Windhoek Station.
