= Heeresfeldbahn =

German or Austrian military field railway

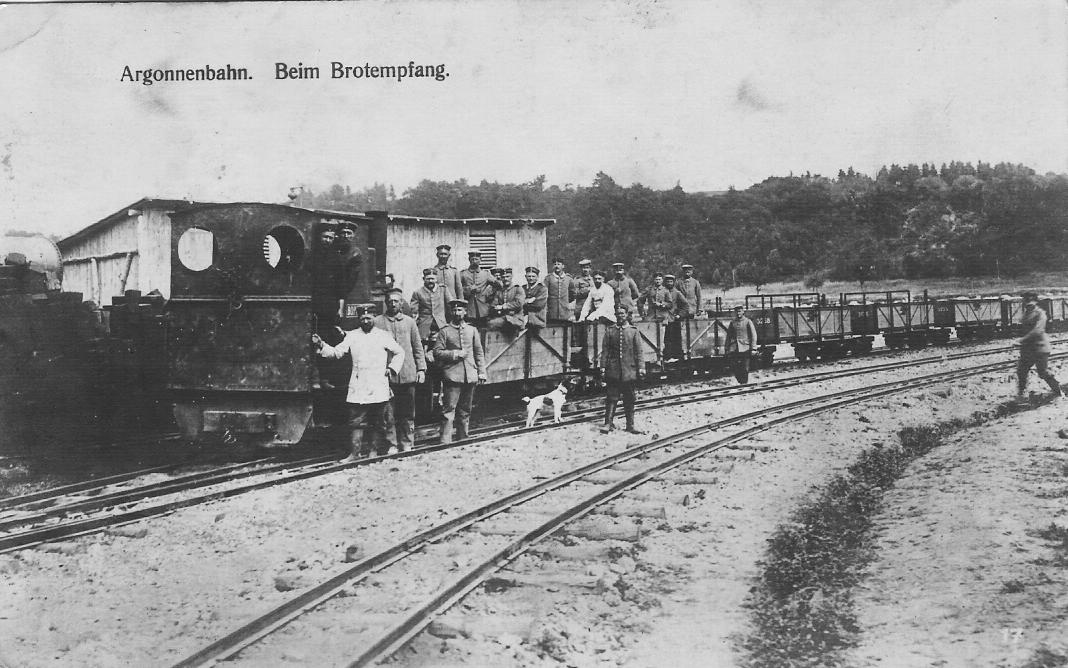
A Heeresfeldbahn in the Forest of Argonne in the First World War

A Heeresfeldbahn is a German or Austrian military field railway (in Austria also called a Rollbahn). They were field railways (Feldbahnen) designed for the military transportation purposes.

== History ==
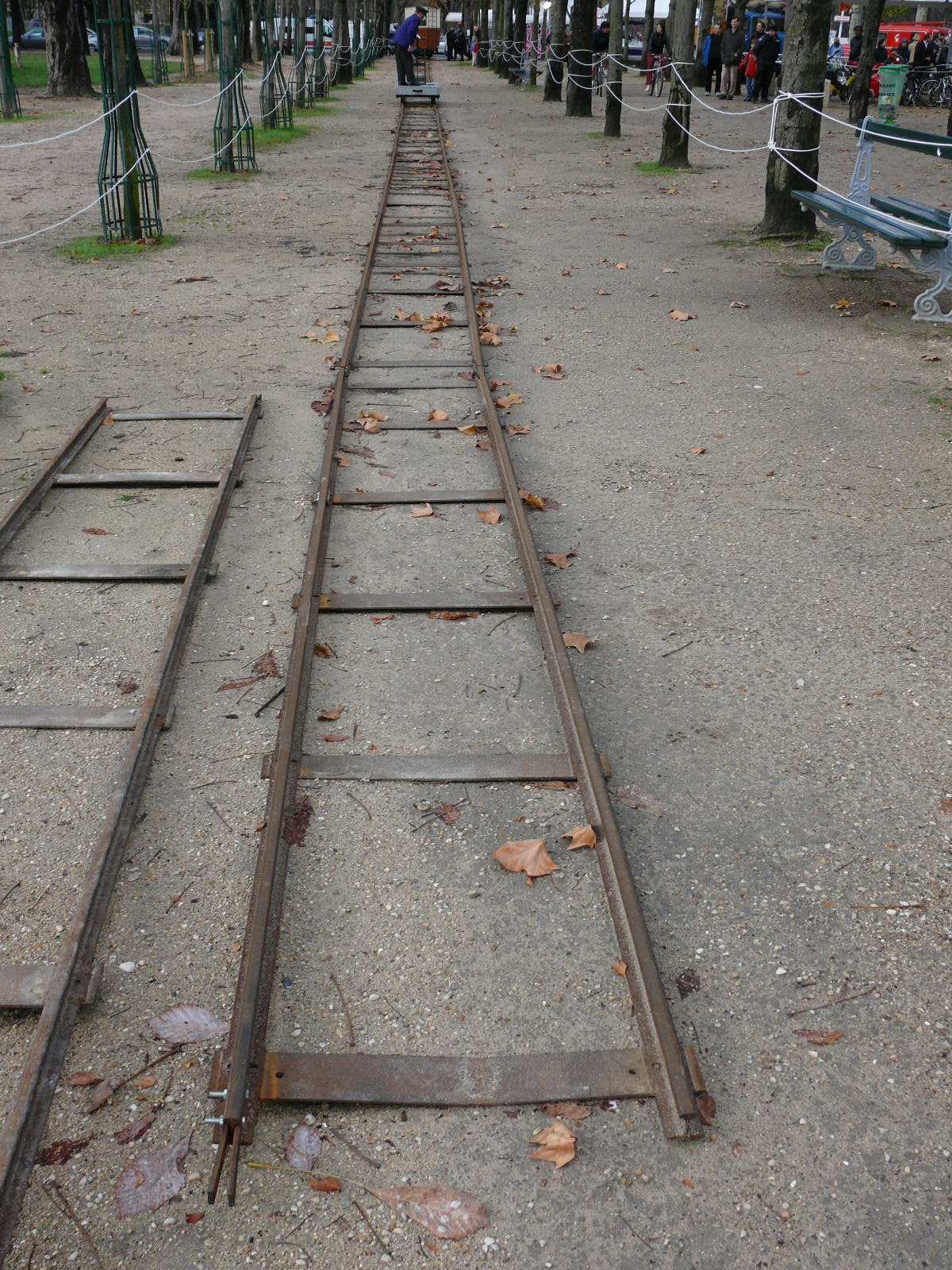
Transportable Feldbahn track of the Decauville type

As railways developed during the 19th century, the military also discovered the utility of this new mode of transport. In stark contrast to the rudimentary road network of the time, the railways could transport large quantities of supplies, heavy equipment and troops rapidly and efficiently. For operations to the front lines the military developed its own system of field railways (Feldbahnen), usually built to a narrow gauge. In addition to the general advantages of narrow gauge railways - they took up less space and could have tighter curves, for example - narrow gauge vehicles and track were more easily transportable and could be quickly moved to conform as the location of the front line changed.

Unlike road transportation, the establishment of a Heeresfeldbahn required the construction of expensive and time-consuming railway infrastructure (albeit of simpler design than conventional railways). They were built by specialist troops trained by the military, known as Eisenbahnpioniere. As a war progressed prisoners of war were also employed. The Heeresfeldbahn is tied to this fixed infrastructure; under artillery bombardment or other acts of war it is not flexible enough compared with lorry transport. A Heeresfeldbahn can also be quickly captured and used by an army's opponents. This could become a major disadvantage if the army has to retreat and is unable to lift or destroy the railway quickly enough.

Due to these disadvantages, the Heeresfeldbahn completely lost its importance in the second half of the 20th century and was replaced by road vehicles which were now more technically advanced, cross-country capable and did not require specially trained crews. In particularly difficult terrain, air transportation is now also used (especially helicopters). The use of military railways is now largely restricted to internal transportation functions on large military sites, e.g. for transportation at munitions depots. In addition there are Feldbahnen on some military training areas e.g. large targets may be mounted on tipper trucks that are hauled by motorised locomotives as mobile targets for live firing exercises.

== Subsequent civilian use ==
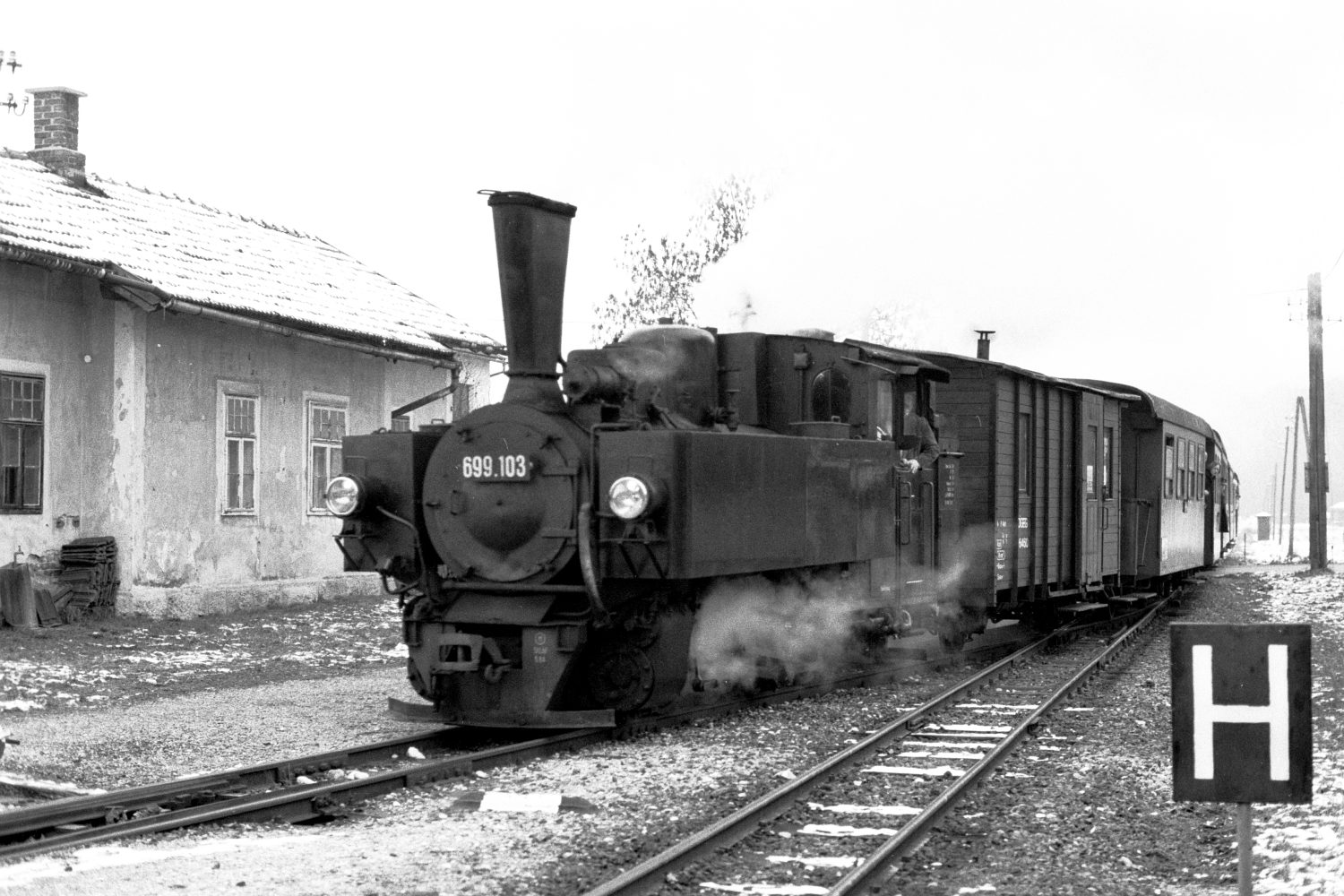
A HF Class 160 D (ÖBB 699.1), converted to a tank engine, on the Steyrtalbahn

In addition to the typical tasks of military field railways in war itself, they were also sometimes used for civilian tasks once the war was over or their military function was finished. Such duties were occasionally carried out by military units and sometimes they built long access lines. For example, in the 1870s, when the Imperial and Royal Military Railway built a supply line from Bosnian Brod to Zenica in Bosnia was quickly expanded into a fully operational narrow gauge railway for general use, thus founding the extensive railway network built to the so-called Bosnian gauge of 760 mm (2 ft 5 15/16 in). Even after the First World War, when the Heeresfeldbahnen were used very widely, a number of routes were used for public transport. For example, the Grödnerbahn in Tyrol, now in South Tyrol - Alto Adige in Italy was built with 760 mm gauge, like the Fleimstalbahn - Ferrovia della Val di Fiemme, as a supply line to the Dolomite front. The narrow gauge Ohrid line from Skopje to Ohrid in Macedonia, over 200 km (120 mi) long with a gauge of 600 mm (1 ft 11 5/8 in), was originally a military railway of this type.

Transportable Feldbahn track materiel, locomotives and wagons were often sold to civilian companies after the cessation of hostilities and the politically driven disbandment of the troops responsible for them. This materiel was occasionally still in use for decades after the war's end. For example, in some peat works today there are still track sections from the Imperial Austrian Military Railway to be found and in Feldbahn museums there is a variety of steel relics to be seen.

== Rolling stock ==
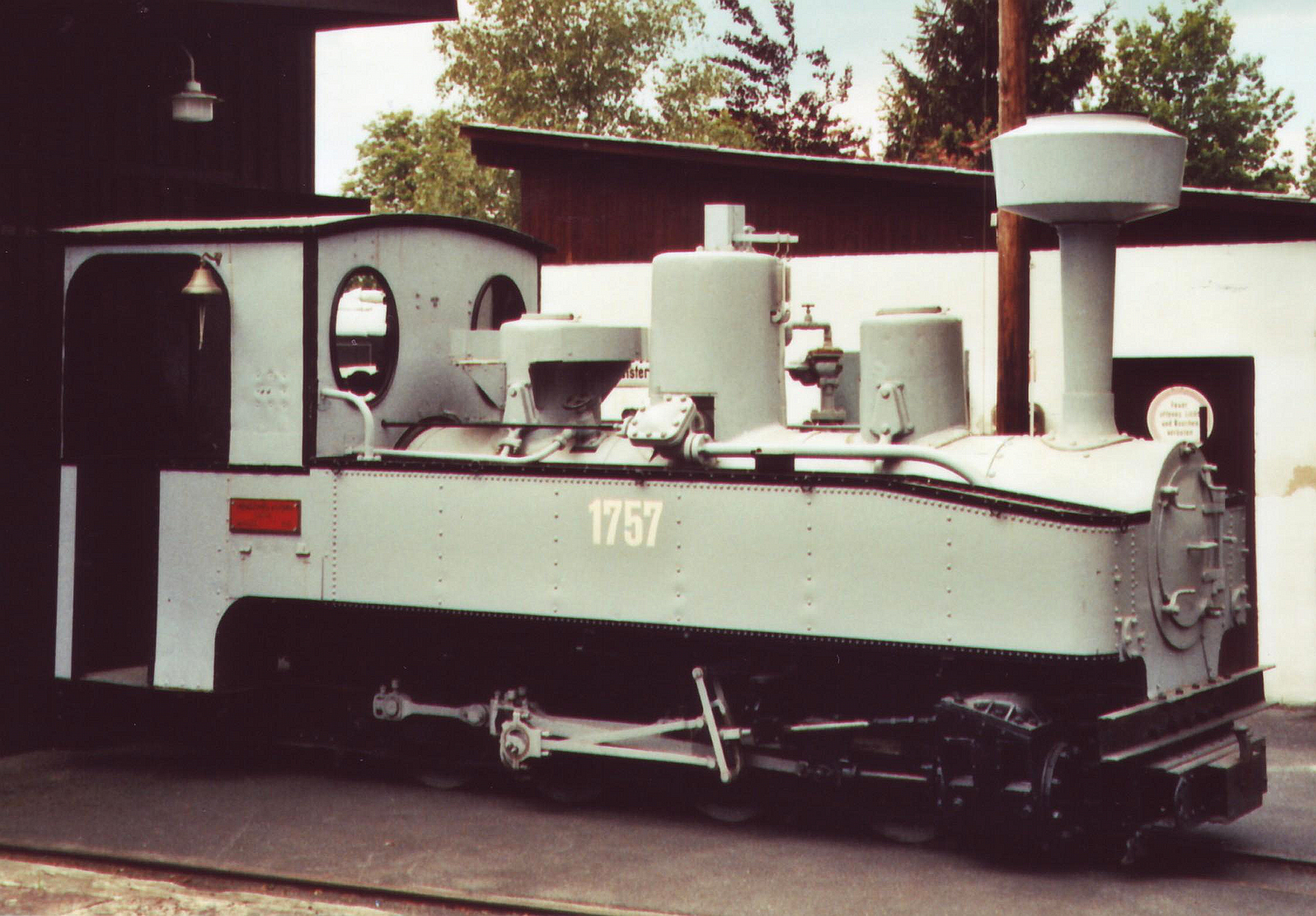
German Brigadelok preserved by a museum

Usually special rolling stock was developed for Heeresfeldbahnen. Their locomotives, the so-called Heeresfeldbahnlokomotiven (lit: army field railway locomotives) or Brigadelok were characterised by their simple, rugged design, their ability to negotiate very tight curve radii and travel over extremely poor-quality trackbeds safely. These design features also made them interesting for civilian uses such as the forest railways (Waldbahnen) used in forestry or on civilian field railways (Feldbahnen).

== Kasemattenbahn ==
A special type of Heeresfeldbahn is the Kasemattenbahn (lit: casemate railway), specifically for use in fortified military installations. It is usually used to ensure a reliable and copious provision of supplies inside the narrow passages of casemates. They are found, for example, on the Atlantic Wall, the fortified installations in the Ardennes and in fortified British harbours.

== See also ==
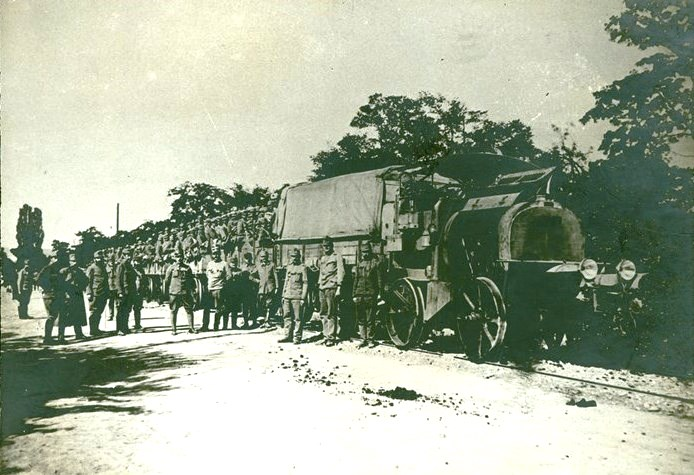
Austro-hungarian feldbahn

- Feldbahn
- Forest railway
- Light railway
- Military railways
- Military cableways in the First World War
- Trench railways

== Sources ==
- Gottwaldt, Alfred B. (1998). Heeresfeldbahnen (1st ed.). Stuttgart: Transpress. ISBN 3-613-70818-3.
- Wernekke, Victor von Röll (1914). "Feldbahnen für militärische Zwecke". Enzyklopädie des Eisenbahnwesens. Vol. 5. Berlin, Wien: Urban & Schwarzenberg. pp. 54–58.
- Fach, Rüdiger; Krall, Günter (2002). Heeresfeldbahnen der Kaiserzeit (1st ed.). Nordhorn: Kenning. ISBN 3-933613-46-9.
- Stanfel, Dieter (2008). K.u.k. Militärfeldbahnen im Ersten Weltkrieg. Hövelhof: DGEG. ISBN 978-3-937189-41-3.
