= Heeresfeldbahnlokomotive HF 160 D =

HF 160 D
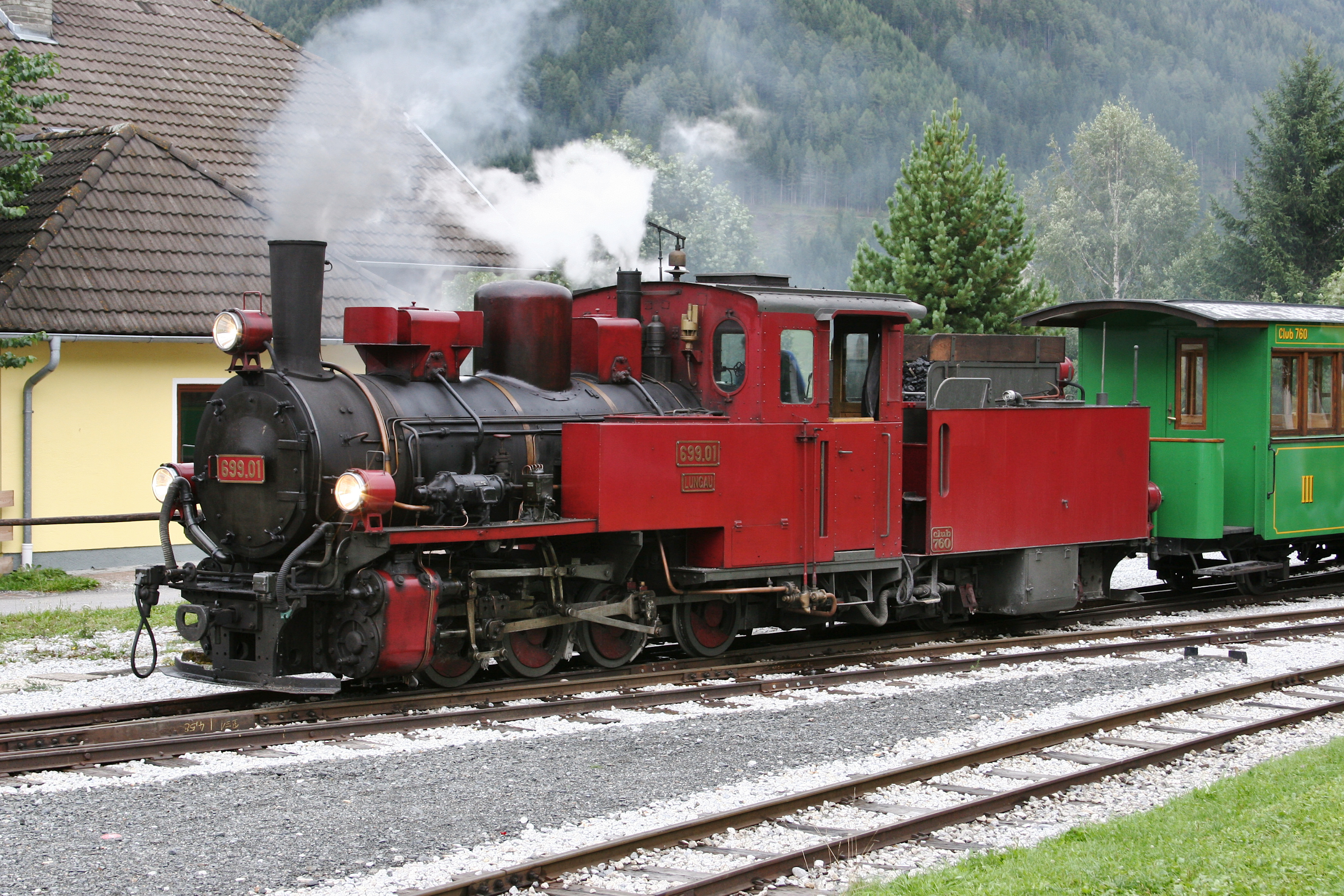
- ÖBB 699.01
Type and origin
- Builder: Société Franco-Belge
- Build date: 1944-45
Specifications
- Configuration
  - Whyte: 0-8-0
  - UIC: D
- Gauge: 750 mm (2 ft 5 1/2 in) and 760 mm (2 ft 5 15/16 in)
- Tender weight: 12,5 t
- Tender type: 2T6
- Fuel capacity: 0,5 t * + 2,5 t **
- Water cap.: 0,6 m^{3} * + 6m^{3} **
- Cylinders: 2
- Valve gear: Walschaerts (Heusinger)
Performance figures
- Maximum speed: 25 km/h
- Indicated power: 160 PSi
Career
- Numbers: ÖBB 699.01-03; ÖBB 699.101-104 (rebuild); SKGLB 19; W&LLR No. 10
- Retired: 1968
- *) Loco capacity **) Tender capacity

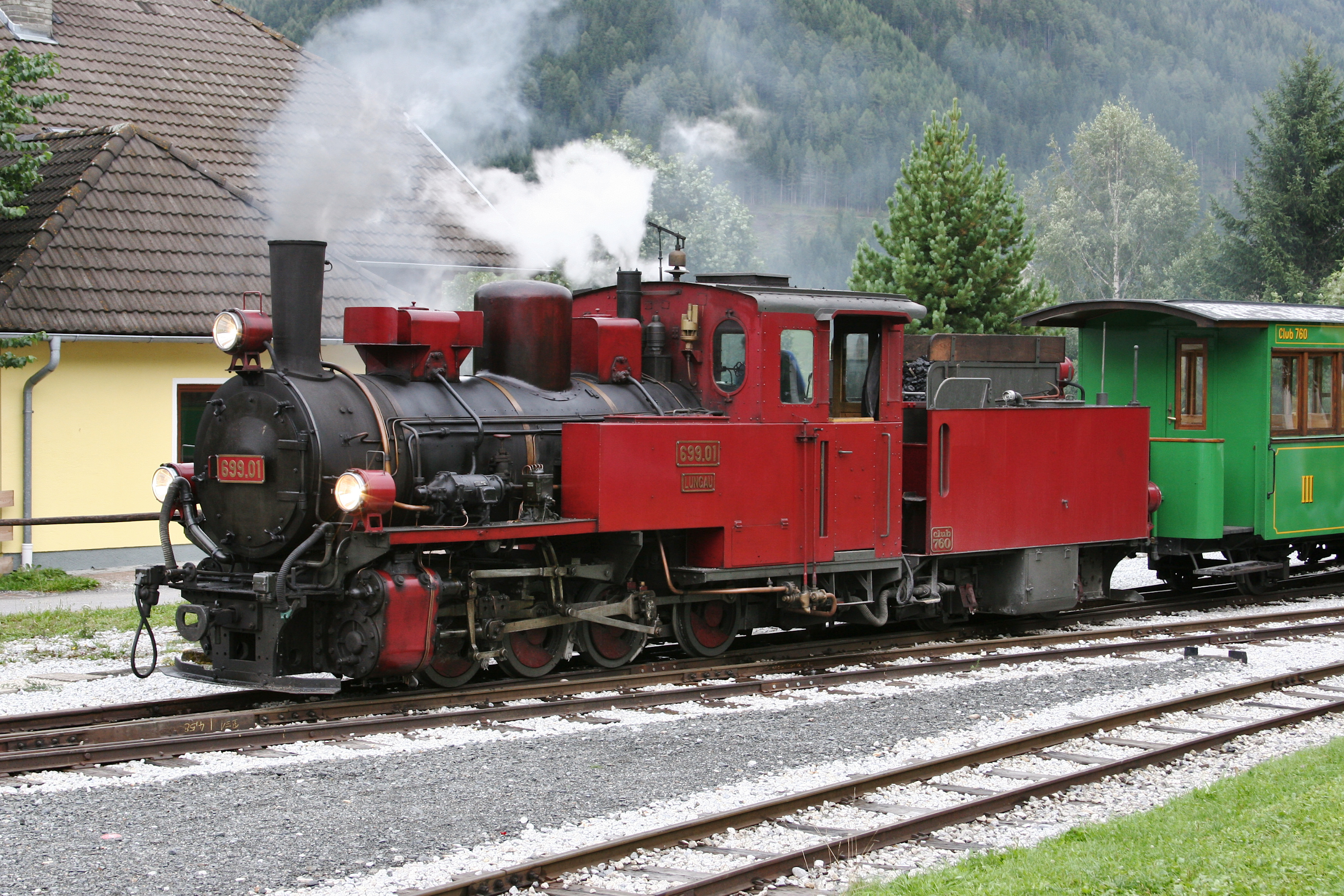
Club 760 699.01 in red tourist railway livery on the Taurach Railway in Mauterndorf

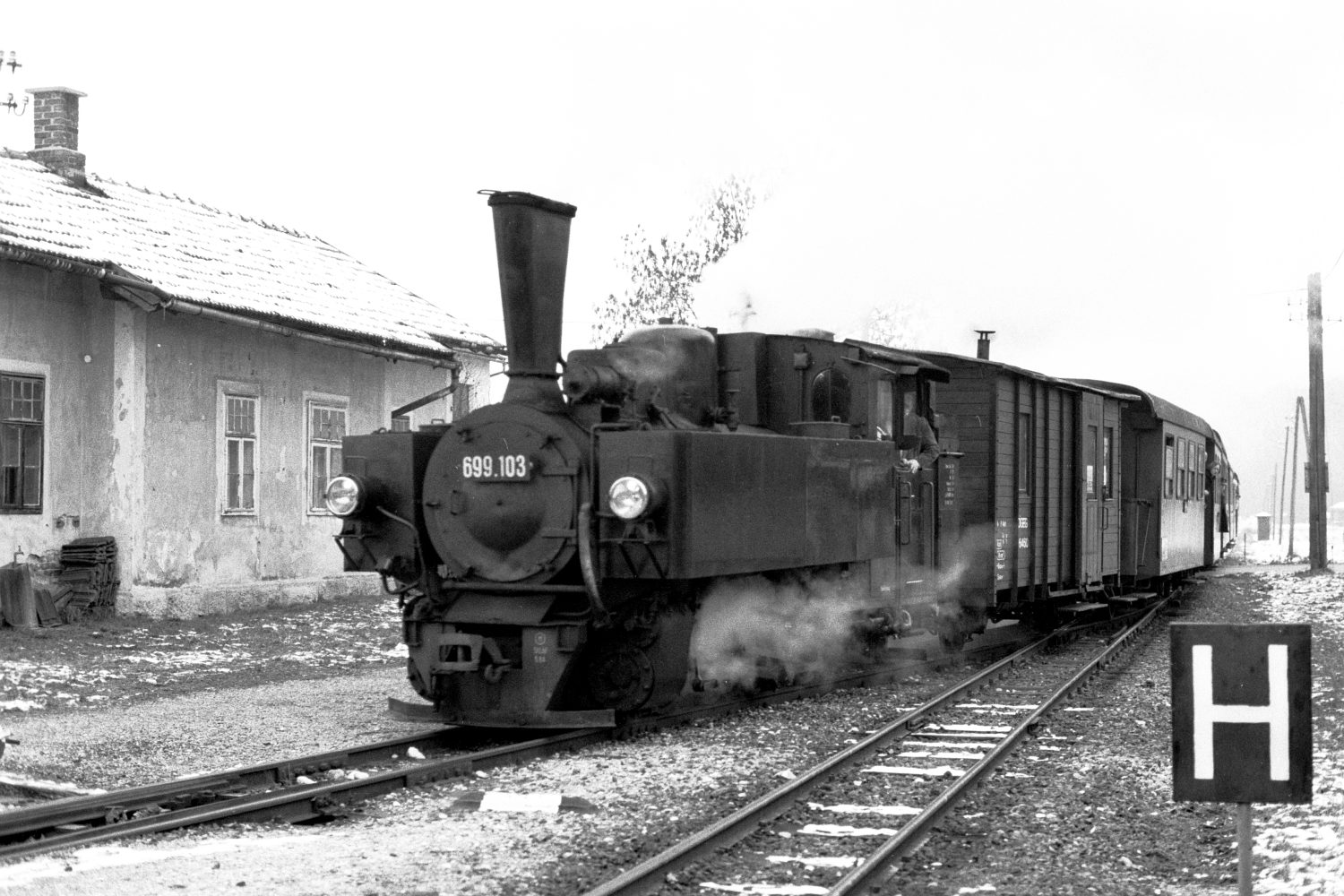
Tank loco 699.103 at Aschach an der Steyr station on the Steyr Valley Railway

The German narrow gauge steam locomotives of military field railway (Heeresfeldbahn) class HF 160 D were 0-8-0 tender locomotives developed for wartime service during the Second World War. The engines were also classified as Kriegsdampflokomotive 11 (wartime steam locomotive 11) or KDL 11. After the war the locomotives were put to use for civilian purposes.

== HF 160 D in Austria ==
In the Austrian Federal Railway (ÖBB), the locomotives were grouped into Class 699. Class 699.1 was a rebuild of the engines into tank locomotives. Class 699 engines could be encountered on several ÖBB narrow gauge railways: the Bregenzerwald Railway, the Pinzgau Railway, the Waldviertel Narrow Gauge Railway, the Vellach Valley Railway and the Steyr Valley Railway. Six engines had been retired by 1973, number 699.103 belonged to the operating fleet of the Steyrtalbahn until its withdrawal in 1982.

== Post 1945 ==
- Société Franco-Belge 2817/1944: HF 2817 → ÖBB 699.101 → Gurk Valley Railway 699.101, operational
- Société Franco-Belge 2818/1944: HF 2818 → ÖBB 699.01 → Club 760 699.01, working, in use on the Taurachbahn
- Société Franco-Belge 2819/1944: HF 2819 → ÖBB 699.102
- Société Franco-Belge 2821/1944: HF 2821 → ÖBB 699.103
- Société Franco-Belge 2822/1944: HF 2822 → ÖBB 699.02 → ? → Deutsches Technikmuseum Berlin, not working
- Société Franco-Belge 2836/1945: ? → CFCD No. 10, working, Chemin de fer Froissy-Dompierre (APPEVA), France
- Société Franco-Belge 2843/1945: ? → AMTP Nr. 4–12, converted to 600 mm (1 ft 11 5/8 in) rail gauge, working, Pithiviers, France; L'Association du Musée des Transports de Pithiviers
- Société Franco-Belge 2844/1945: ? → No. unknown, converted to 600 mm rail gauge, not working, Bligny sur Ouches, France, http://www.lepetittraindebligny.com/
- Société Franco-Belge 2845/1945: ? → Le Petit Train de la Vallee de la Dollar (1,435 mm (4 ft 8 1/2 in)), France (loco converted to standard gauge)
- Société Franco-Belge 2855/1944: HF 2855 → SKGLB 19 –without tender→ STLB 699.01 → W&LLR No. 10 Sir Drefaldwyn, Powys, Wales, Great Britain
- Société Franco-Belge 2856/1944: HF 2856 → ÖBB 699.03
- Société Franco-Belge 2857/1944: HF 2857 → ÖBB 699.104

== See also ==
- Heeresfeldbahn - German military field railways
