= Military cableways in the First World War =

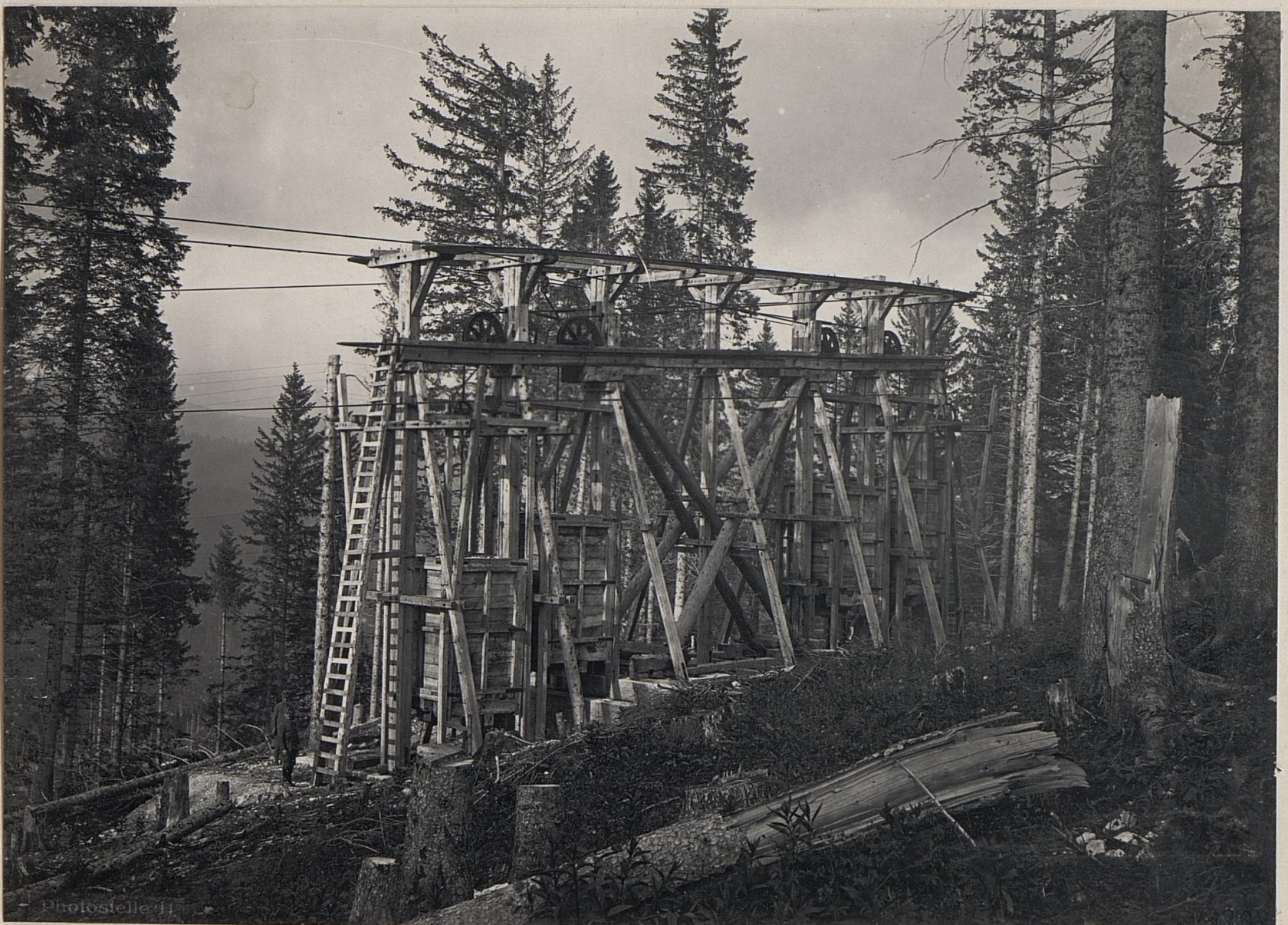
Cable tension apparatus, Mandrielle on the Asiago plateau

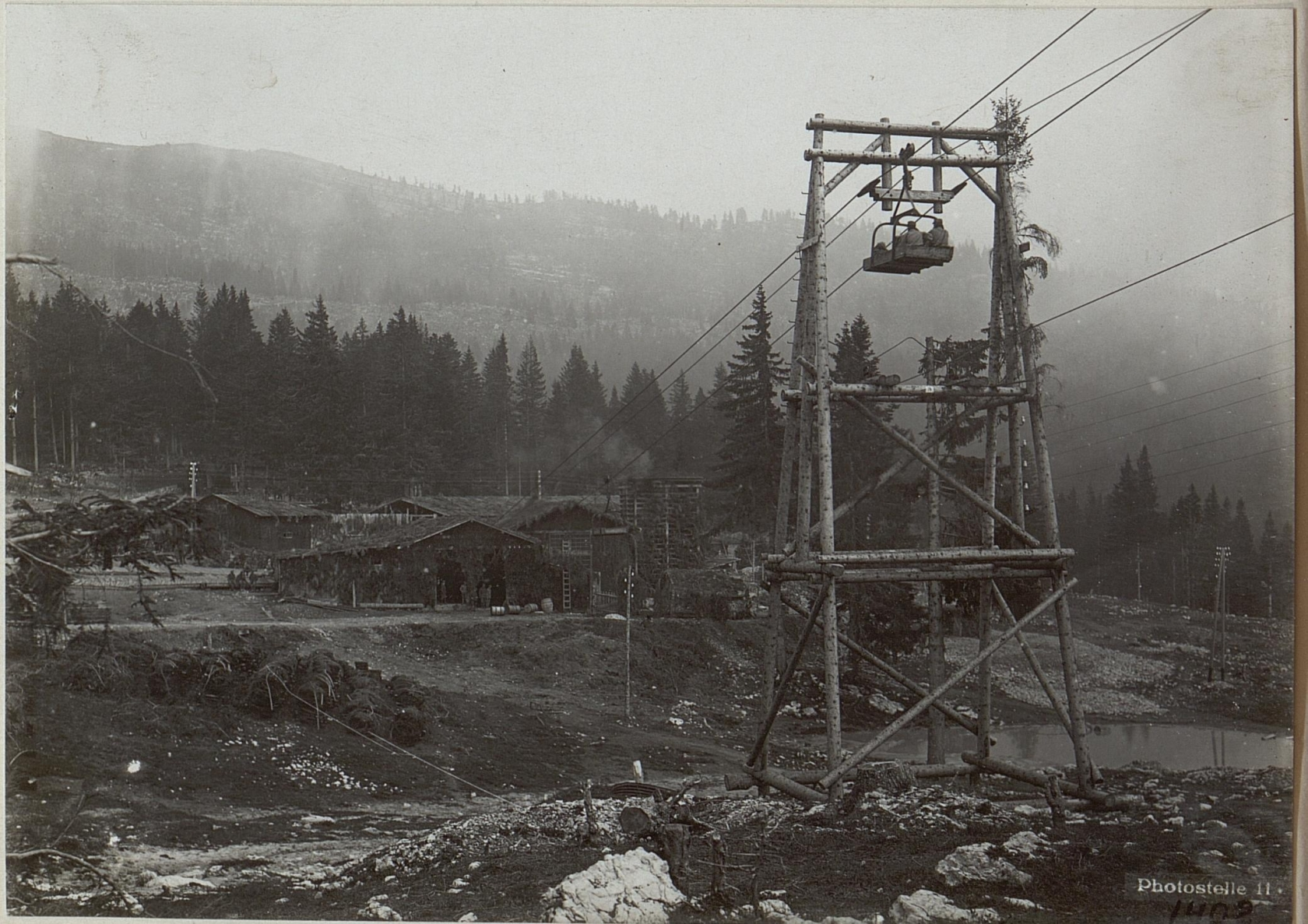
Cableway station at Mandrielle

Military cableways (Italian: teleferiche militari, German: Militär-Seilbahnen) were used in the First World War by Italy and Austria-Hungary to transport supplies up to their troops in mountain sectors of the front. Troops were often in high-altitude positions during the so-called “White War”, far removed from roads, mule tracks, pathways or existing cablecars. Moreover, where such infrastructure did exist, it generally followed the easiest routes and was therefore exposed to enemy fire. Providing the troops on the front line with a reliable supply of food and ammunition therefore often required the building of new infrastructure.

== Building the networks ==
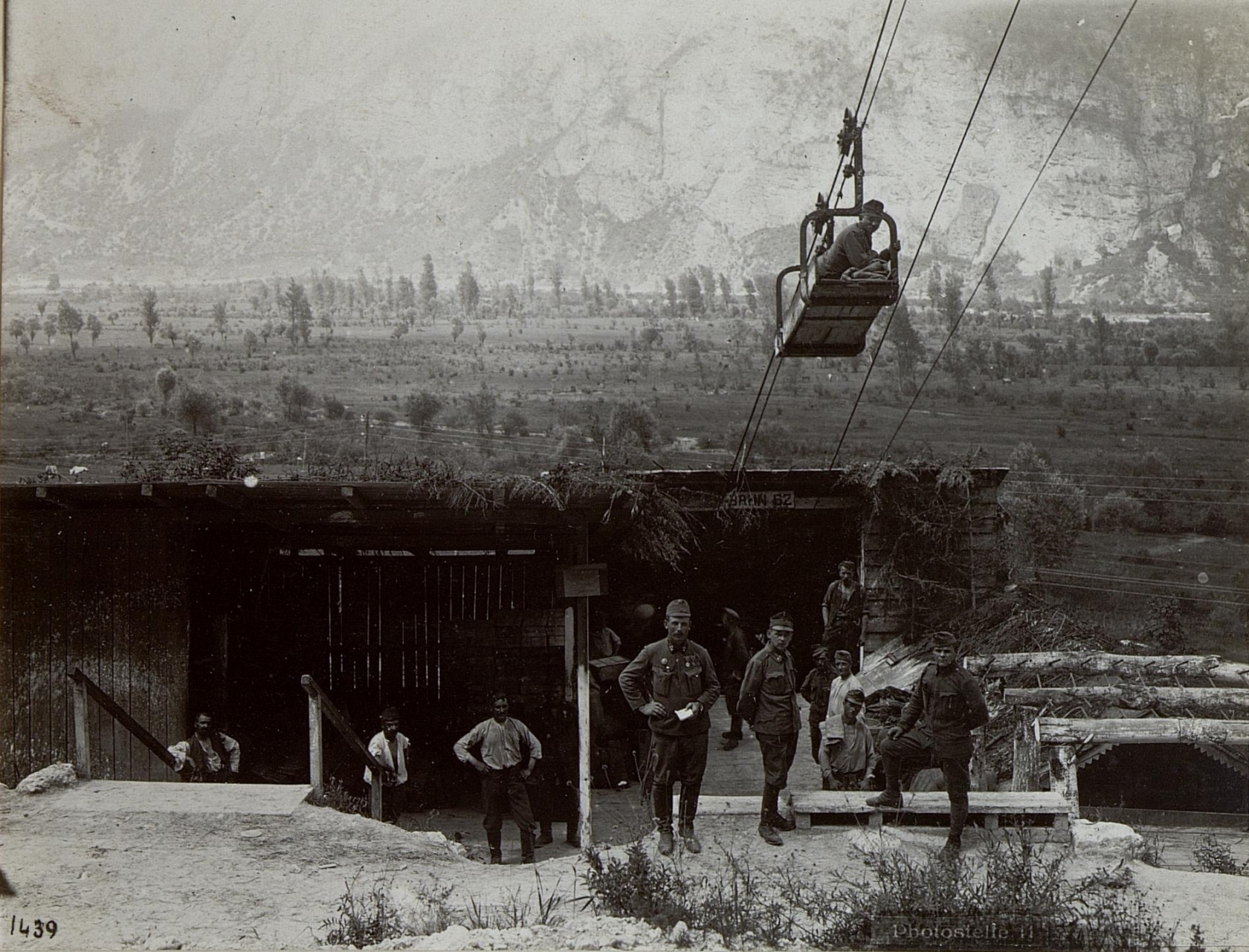
Valley station of cableway 62

Military cableways had to be built where they were needed, regardless of how difficult the terrain might be. As well as overcoming steep, impassable slopes, the engineers who built them had to deal with rockfalls and avalanches and sometimes work under enemy fire. The technical demands of the new cableways were sometimes extreme. For example, Austrian cableways had to cross large glaciers in the Ortler and Adamello sectors, requiring spans that had never before been attempted.

Cableways were the final stage of a complex transport relay. First, on the Austrian side, military railways (Heeresfeldbahnen) were laid down as close to the front as possible. Beyond this transport was initially by pack animal or by porter, but both beasts and humans required large supplies of food themselves, and could not continue to work in the depths of winter. When it became clear that the war was going to last through the winter of 1915, cableways were the only solution the armies could rely on.

== Austro-Hungarian cableways ==
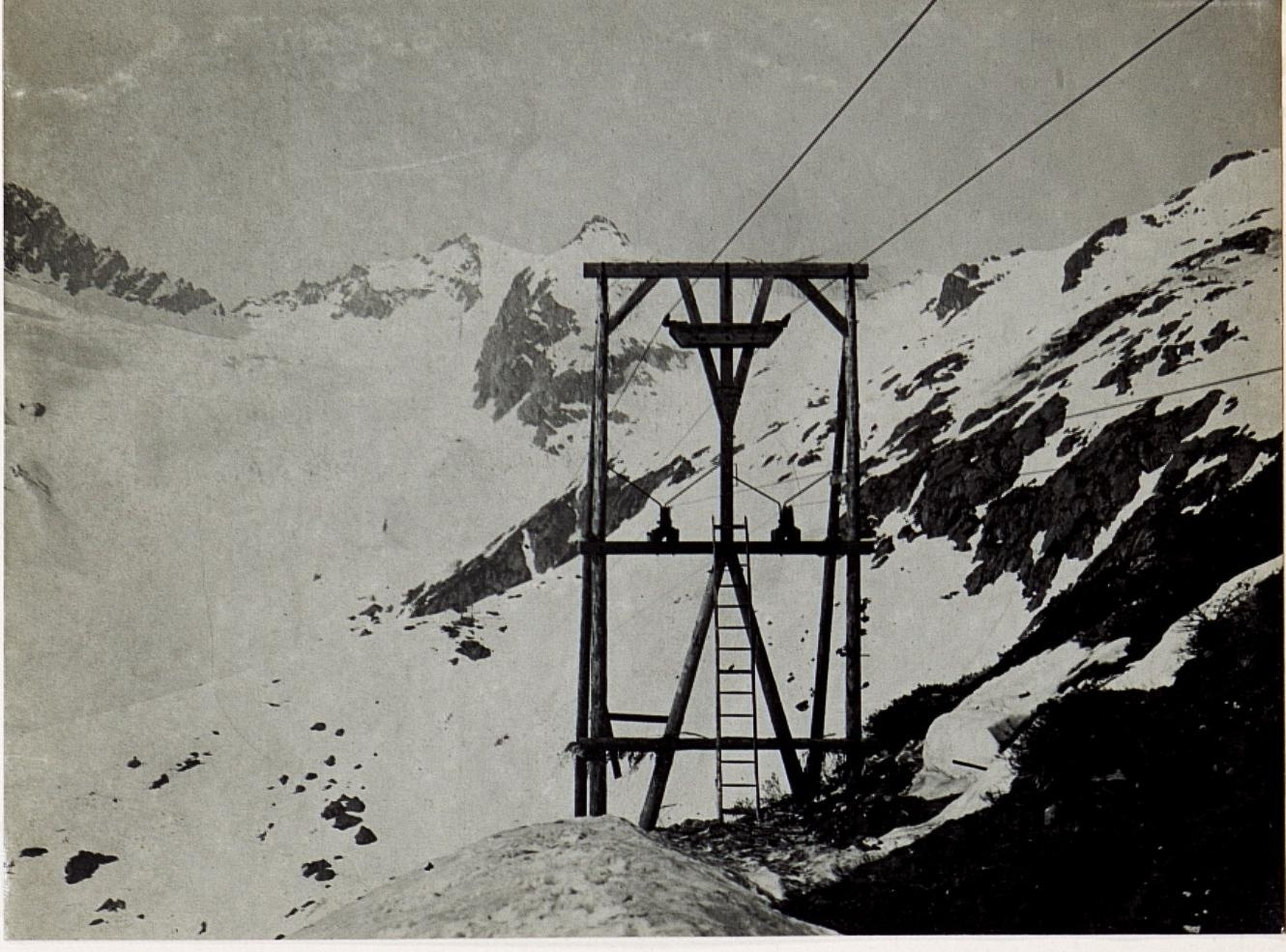
Austrian cableway on Presanella

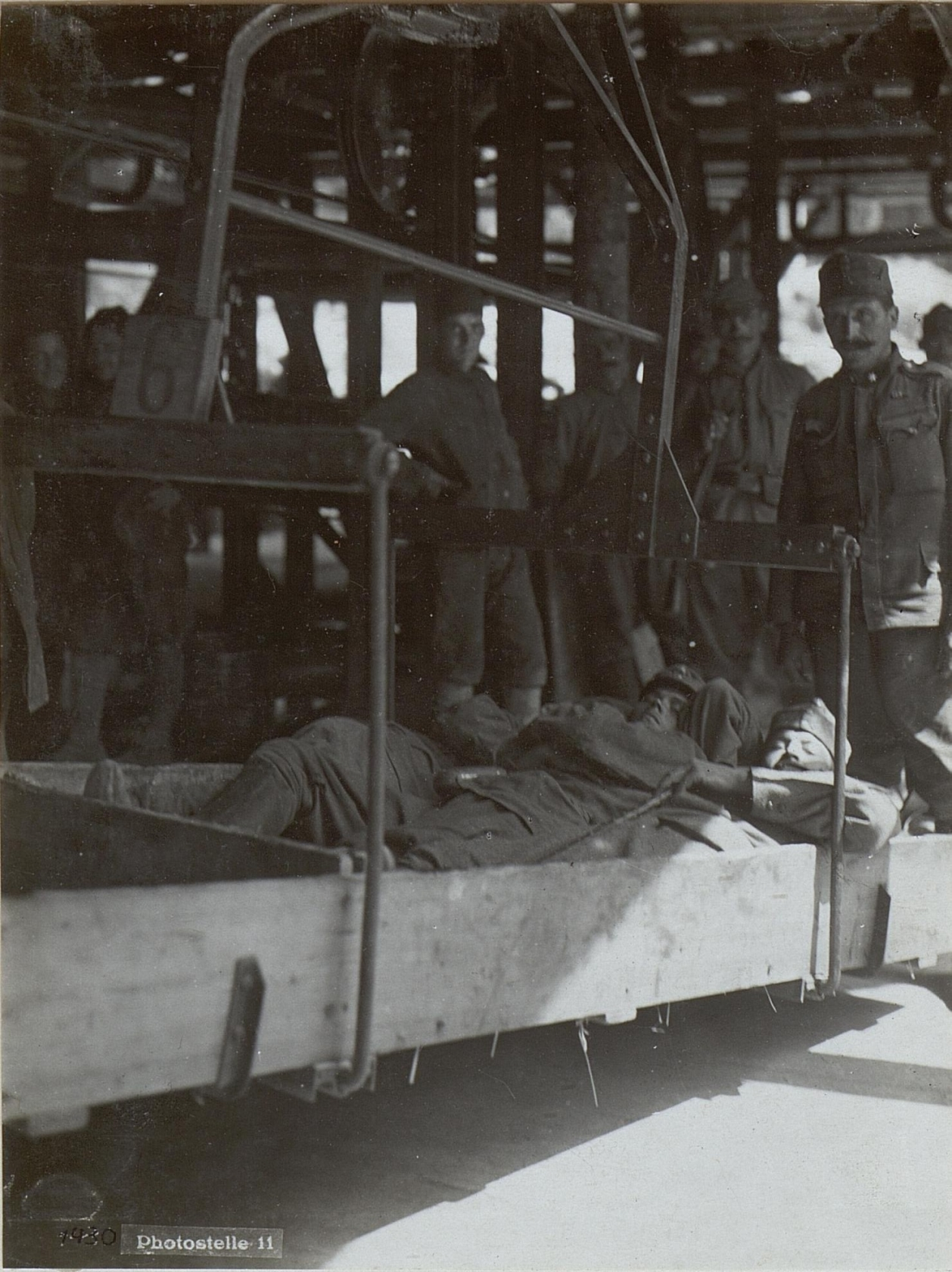
Cableway 70-b trolley carrying a wounded soldier.

Austria-Hungary's first experience of modern warfare in a mountain setting came during the occupation of Bosnia-Herzegovina in 1878. Here the importance of infrastructure such as cableways was first appreciated, and the government began to make preparations for the transport of goods and even soldiers by this means in future conflicts. Even before the start of the First World War, there was a specialist cableway unit as part of the Railway Regiment.

When Italy declared war in May 1915, "Cableway formations" (Seilbahn-formationen) were hastily put together with men from companies with relevant technical expertise and other soldiers. These included a large number of riflemen who knew the local terrain, being familiar with the location. The formations, soon renamed “Cableway Companies”, were affiliated with the Austro-Hungarian Railway Regiment.

On the Isonzo front, Austrian cableways could span up to 2 kilometres. By the end of the war there were 1735 kilometres of cableways operated by 6665 personnel. The two biggest spans were from Bohini up to Mt Peski (next to Mount Krn/Monte Nero) and from Kranjska Gora across the Vrsic pass to Trenta. Each day, several hundred tons of cargo was transported on these two cableways alone. Both of these cableways, as well as military roads and other war infrastructure, were built using Russian prisoners of war in conditions of such extreme hardship that between eight and ten thousand of them died of cold, hunger and exhaustion. Another fifteen smaller cableways in this area carried about 4 tons daily. On the other side of the Isonzo, the Italians had eighteen cableways.

== Austrian technology ==
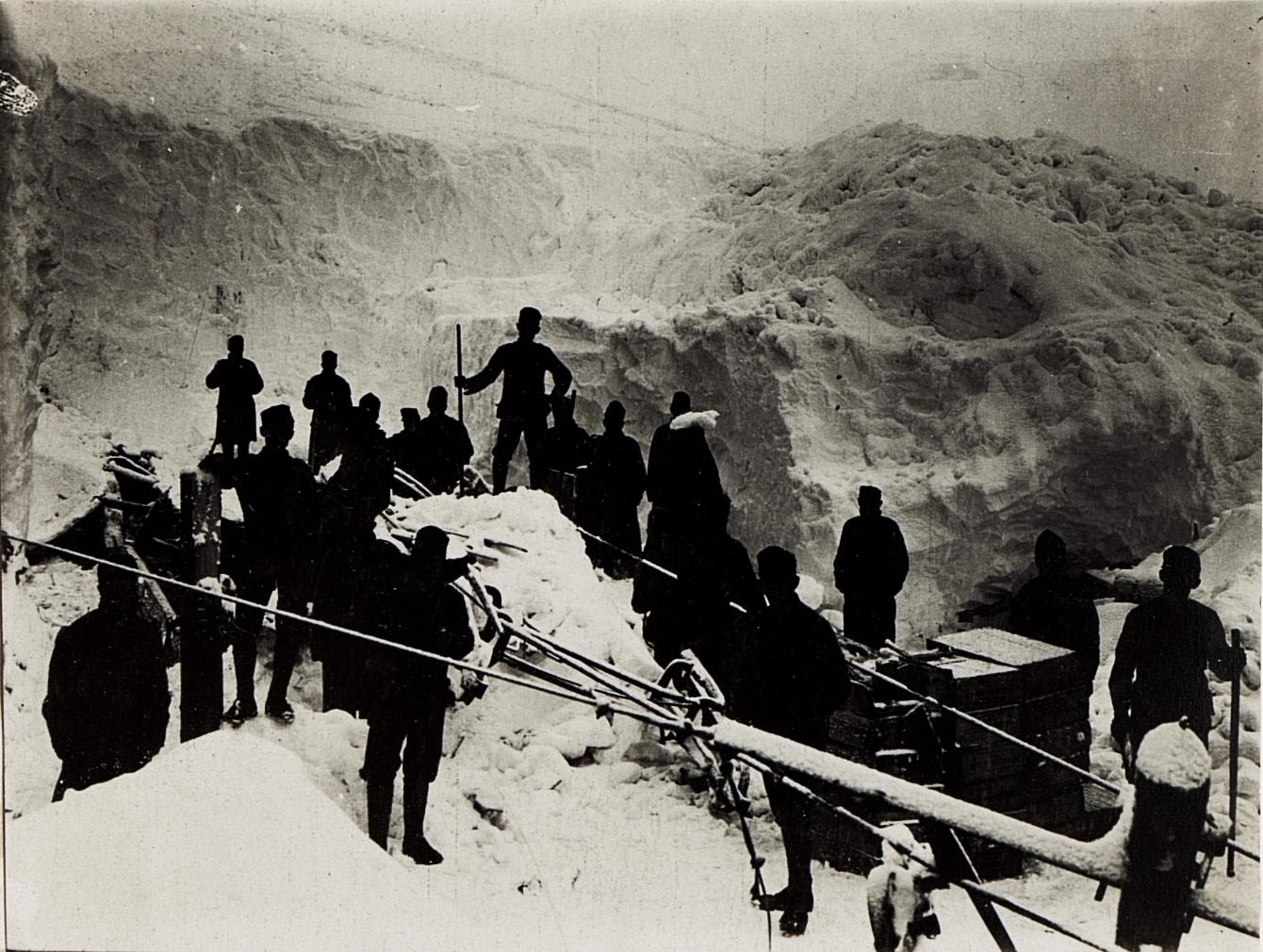
Cableway buried by an avalanche in the Ceremana Gorge

Small manual lifts could be hauled by the combat troops themselves, for lengths of between one and 1.5 kilometers, raising up to 100 kg per container. In addition, so-called brake cable cars were used on some sections. These had no drive and could only be used for downhill transport. The containers used gravity to descend, with the movement controlled by a rope brake.

Heavier loads required mechanisation, and the army built cableways with spans of up to 2.5 km as well as cable lifts with spans of 1.5 km between stations. The technology came from established German firms, including Adolf Bleichert & Co. and de:Gesellschaft für Förderanlagen Ernst Heckel. Powered by gasoline, crude oil, electricity or steam, these engines had an output of 25 hp. The largest unsupported span was 500 meters. With cars running on a single cable these mechanisms could carry 200–300 tons of material in 24 hours. Austrian models from Hinterschweiger, Waagner-Biro, Zuegg, Köllensperger and Rüsch – Ganahl were also used. With a lower output of 8-14 hp, they were powered by gasoline, crude oil or electric motors.

For small loads, on single-cable lifts, up to 40 tons could be transported daily in high mountain positions. Single-track cable cars could move up to 100 tons and for sections with increased material requirements, two-way cables allowed a daily capacity of up to 500 tons.

== Italian cableways ==
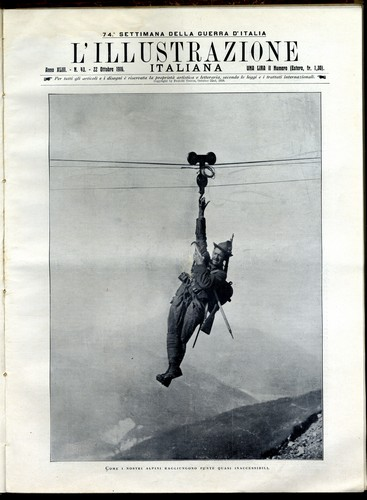
Italian soldier using a cableway to reach extreme positions

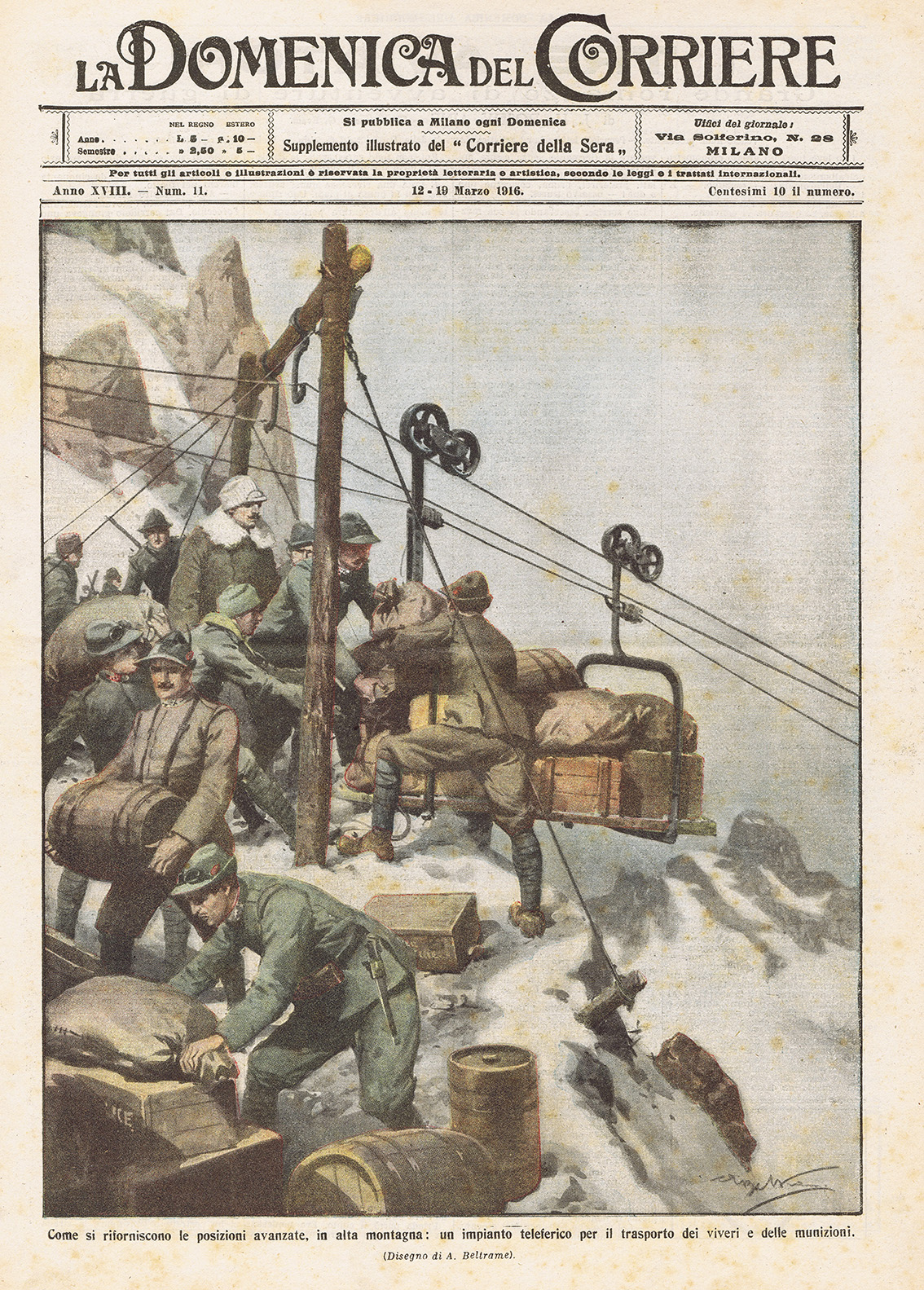
Bringing supplies to troops in the high mountains

Italy began developing cableways rather later than Austria-Hungary. Each day, an Alpine brigade required around 200 tons of supplies – food, equipment, clothing and ammunition. In 1915 all of this was brought up to the front line by mules, donkeys, civilians pressed into service, or prisoners of war. Under the harsh conditions in the mountains it could take well over an hour to cover one kilometre, and both porters and pack animals required supplies themselves, as well as rest. A single cableway could operate for 20 hours a day with a few hundred men and reliably deliver 6 thousand quintals of supplies. Without a cableway it would have required 400 trucks with a thousand drivers or 1,500 carts with 2 thousand soldiers and 3 thousand pack animals to achieve the same.

In 1916 the High Command decided that new, more efficient transport infrastructure was required. In the summer of 1916 the first cableway platoon was formed and by the end of the year another twelve had been formed and assigned to larger units on the front. By October 1917, the Italian Royal Army had built 564 cableways covering a total distance of 614,315 metres. Over the three years of the conflict, the Italian Army built 2,170 cableway installations with a total length of 2,300 kilometers, transporting 3,800 tons of material per hour.

Three companies supplied most of the machinery for the Italian cableways: Ceretti & Tanfani of Leini, Badoni, Bellani and Benazzoli of Lecco and Luigi Spadaccini of Milan. The cableways were of three types; three-rope, “single mobile rope” and "single fixed rope". They carried containers that could carry between 50 kilos and 20 quintals. The systems were designed to be built and dismantled rapidly, using mostly standard parts. It normally took 72 hours to put up the cableway stations, mount the tubular trestles, unwind the cable and raise it onto the trestles by hand.
