= Spiegelau Forest Railway =

Railway line in Germany

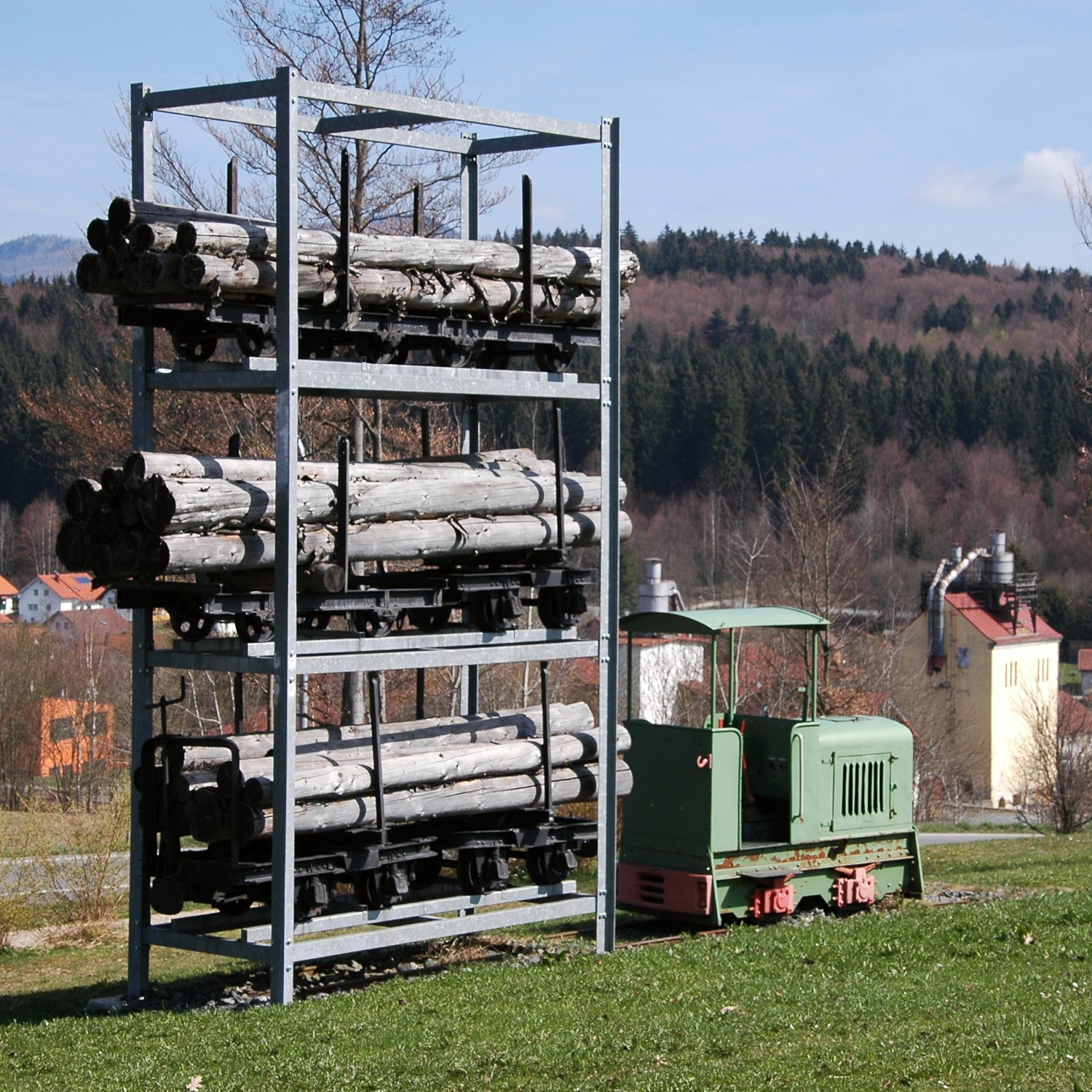
- Memorial in Spiegelau

Overview
- Native name: Spiegelauer Waldbahn
- Locale: Bavaria

Technical
- Line length: 100 km (62 mi)
- Track gauge: 600 mm (1 ft 11 5/8 in)

The Spiegelau Forest Railway (German: Spiegelauer Waldbahn) was a 600 mm (1 ft 11 5/8 in) narrow gauge forest railway built for the transportation of logs from the woods around Spiegelau in the Bavarian Forest in southern Germany.

== Construction ==
After the opening of the Zwiesel–Grafenau railway in 1890, new possibilities arose for the transportation of logs by rail from the woods around the Großer Rachel, one of the highest hills in the Bavarian Forest. At the suggestion of the senior forestry commission officer, Leythäuser, who was elected in 1890 to the government of the province of Lower Bavaria, forestry staff began to lay a 600 mm (1 ft 11 5/8 in) narrow gauge railway from the state railway station at Spiegelau in 1900 under their own steam.

The official authority to build a permanent forest railway was given on 26 August 1908. At that time, a 7 kilometre long section already existed. In November 1909 the official test run took place on the line, now 17.5 km long, in the presence of officials from the Regensburg railway division. Also in 1909 the first two steam locomotives were delivered.

In 1911 the main route reached Mauth, 32 kilometres away. Now a side branch was built towards the Rachel site office. The First World War and the post-war period interrupted further expansion. During the 1920s the network was extended towards Klingenbrunn station and, by 1926, there were 41 kilometres of line and 5 kilometres of sidings.

After the hurricane devastation of 1927, work intensified and a line was built to the forest railway terminus at Finsterau. In the early 1930s the Spiegelau Forest Railway reached its greatest extent with 95 kilometres of permanent way. As new railway sections were now built, old ones were lifted. The last extension of the railway network was as late as 1951 with the construction of a 7 km long stretch to the Scheerhütte by 156 emergency workers. In 1953 the highest point in the network was finally reached at just under 1,000 metres, opening up a 700 hectare area of the forest.

== Operation ==
The Spiegelau Forest Railway transported logs to the loading areas at Spiegelau or at Klingenbrunn, where they were loaded onto standard gauge track and dispatched in the direction of Zwiesel. The lines were very steep and winding. Tracks were laid on robust railway embankments. Tracks were frequently lifted at a particular site, loaded onto a train and relaid elsewhere. At the Betriebswerk in Spiegelau the forestry commission built a locomotive turntable in the early 1920s. At Sagwassersäge there was a wye track and Klingenbrunn had a terminal loop.

As well as logs the railway also carried part-load goods, especially food, to the remote villages of Guglöd, Waldhäuser und the Graupsäge. In 1930 the record load was transported: 118,119 cubic metres of logs, 40,491 stacked cubic metres of laminated wood and 2,127 tonnes of part-load goods.

From the 1920s the locomotive fleet comprised about 7 permanent locomotives, painted green with yellow outline stripes. From 1926 there were also diesel locomotives. The Forest Railway had a total of 12 locomotives, of which 5 were steam, 4 were diesel und 3 petrol-electric locos. At the peak of operations in 1932 it had 355 log wagons (Trucks) and 47 other wagons. In winter railway traffic ceased due to the amount of snow.

== The end ==
After the Second World War the Regensburg federal railway division, who were responsible for construction standards, demanded that the railway was overhauled, which would have cost about 500,000 marks. Because the construction of forest roads and transportation of logs by road vehicles was cheaper, on 21 September 1957 the Regensburg Forestry Department ordered the dismantling of the Spiegelau Forest Railway by 1960. In 1955 the Forest Railway still owned eleven locomotives 182 Trucks and 23 special wagons. In 1957 the tracks were lifted in favour of forest roads. Farewell rides were laid on for the local population. On 11 May 1960 the last train ran; on 8 September the last track was lifted.

== Today ==
The locomotive shed at Spiegelau station is still there. Several former railway embankments form the base for walking trails or vehicle tracks. Some have been uncovered again by the Bavarian Forest National Park.

Early on there were attempts by railway fans to reactivate the Spiegelau Forest Railway as a museum railway. In addition there is a permanent exhibition about the Forest Railway at the information centre in Spiegelau. A Forest Railway locomotive and three wagons are also displayed in the village centre.

Since 10 August 2003 a short Feldbahn section has been built at Riedlhütte by the Feld- und Waldbahnverein Riedlhütte (Riedlhütte Field and Forest Railway Society). This has since been regularly operated. It is however a completely new line, which was built alongside the former Forest Railway trackbed in the village centre.

== Sources ==
- Ludwig Reiner, Hermann Beiler, Richard Sliwinski: Die Spiegelauer Waldbahn. Ohetaler Verlag, Riedlhütte, 2005 - Format DINA4, 164 Seiten - ISBN 3-937067-14-0
- Walther Zeitler: Eisenbahnen im Bayerischen Wald. Verlag Morsak, Grafenau, 3. Aufl. 1980, OCLC 13559880
