= Feldbahn =

German term for narrow-gauge field railway used to transport raw materials

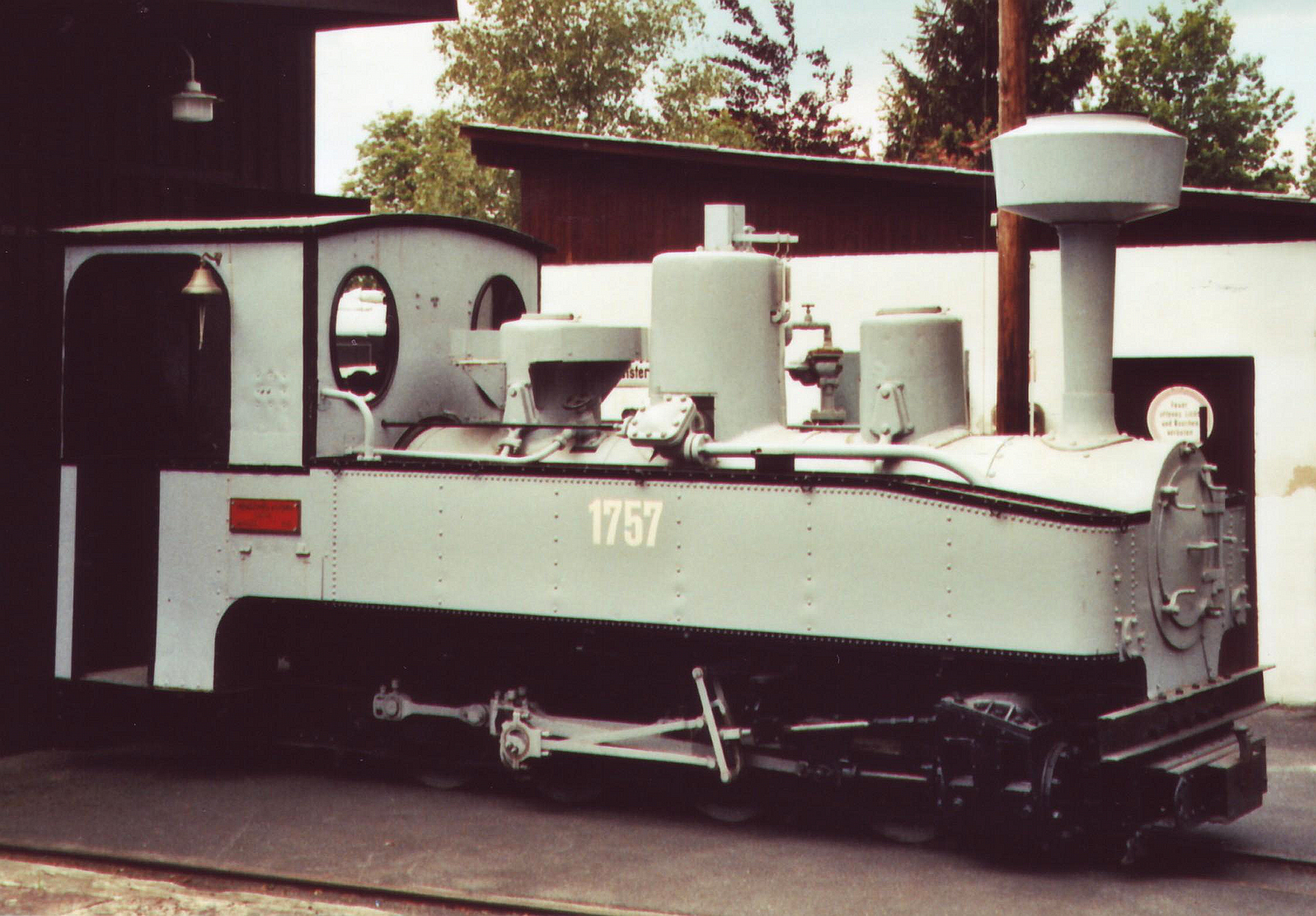
Heeresfeldbahn Brigadelok:de: 0-8-0T locomotive from WWI

A Feldbahn, or Lorenbahn, is the German term for a narrow-gauge field railway, usually not open to the public, which in its simplest form provides for the transportation of agricultural, forestry (Waldbahn) and industrial raw materials such as wood, peat, stone, earth and sand. Such goods are often transported in tipper wagons, known in German as Loren, hence such a railway is also referred to as a Lorenbahn.

== Military use ==
During the First World War, the enormous logistical demands of trench warfare led to the development of military narrow-gauge railway or Heeresfeldbahn networks, also referred to as trench railways. Throughout World War I, the British and French also used trench railways, called War Department Light Railways and Decauville railways respectively. However, the German approach was less improvised and more permanent. With each successful advance, the British and French forces faced ever lengthening supply lines, while the Germans retreated deeper towards their homeland. As a result, the Feldbahn was an organic growth of existing agricultural, industrial and mining railways. After the war, much remaining trackage and rolling stock was put to use in more conventional narrow-gauge applications throughout Europe.

== General use ==
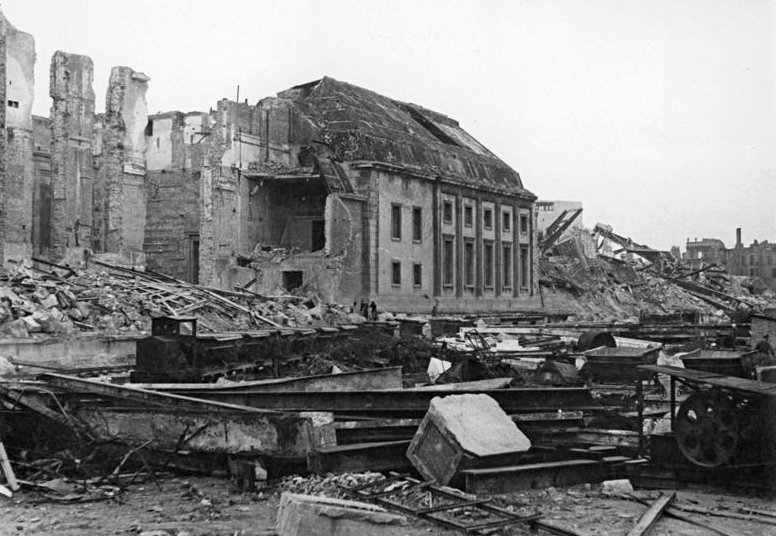
Trümmerbahn clearing rubble in front of the ruin of the Reichskanzlei, Berlin 30th September 1950

In the processing industry, these narrow-gauge railways once held an important role. As a result, Feldbahnen were frequently associated with refractory clay factories, brickyards, sugar factories and iron and steel mills. They were also used for pulling canal barges, transporting military materiel and personnel and removing materials from large-scale building sites and the rubble (Trümmerbahn) from ruined cities after the Second World War. Rail gauges were between 400 mm (15 3/4 in) and 1,000 mm (3 ft 3 3/8 in) metre gauge.

The track (rails and sleepers) utilised, ranged from light, rail frames that could be carried and laid by two men and were often laid directly on the ground with no trackbed, to properly laid, ballasted lines for heavy loads and extended use. Tight curves enabled lines to be more easily routed, largely without structures being required, even in difficult terrain. Provisional track laid along the edges of ditches as they were being extended forward, often on soft ground, led occasionally to derailments. As a result, on many Feldbahnen, wooden planks and other lifting gear were carried. Turntables were usually operated by hand.

Simple and robust vehicles characterised everyday operations. Locomotives were not always available, so it was quite common for individual wagons - even when loaded - to be moved with horses or by human muscle power alone. In tight spaces or where access was difficult, the help of children and youngsters was enlisted to haul tipper wagons.

Frequently rolling stock was hand-built or was manufactured to order in small batches. Usually no signals were installed, the low speeds enabling trains to be driven by sight. At level crossings on larger roads, temporary bells or light signals were installed, that enabled trains to cross safely.

In the munitions depots of the German Federal Navy (Bundesmarine), narrow-gauge railways with a rail gauge of 600 mm (1 ft 11 5/8 in) were used to move ammunition and materiel. In the depot at Laboe type S 14 (14 kg/m or 28.2 lb/yd) rail profiles were laid and later changed to new S 20 (20 kg/m or 40.3 lb/yd) rails . One type DS 60 locomotive and 18 DIEMA DS 90 locomotives were used. The railway stock there also included a fire fighting train, a snow blower and even a rotary snow plough. Three seated coaches were available for the transport of personnel. The line at Aurich depot was closed in 1982 and last operations in Laboe took place in 1993. Finally, in December 1996, the Laboe railway was closed. Its total track length was 25 km (16 mi). A DS 90 locomotive, no. 9, is still in the depot at Laboe as a memorial.

== Today's situation ==
The use of Feldbahnen declined dramatically in the late 20th century, as their tasks have been taken on by lorries and electrically driven conveyor belts. They are now used only where the ground conditions (e.g. moorland or peat bogs) or lack of space (mining) render the routine use of other means impractical. The Feldbahn is still widely used in Germany in industrial peat extraction, especially in Lower Saxony and Schleswig-Holstein. In addition they are still used occasionally in brickworks and other industrial premises. As a result, increasing numbers of museums and societies dedicate themselves to the protection of historical Feldbahn railways. This includes efforts in many places to restore closed Feldbahnen again and to give them new life as museum railways.

== Feldbahn museums and working lines ==
=== Germany ===
==== Baden-Württemberg ====
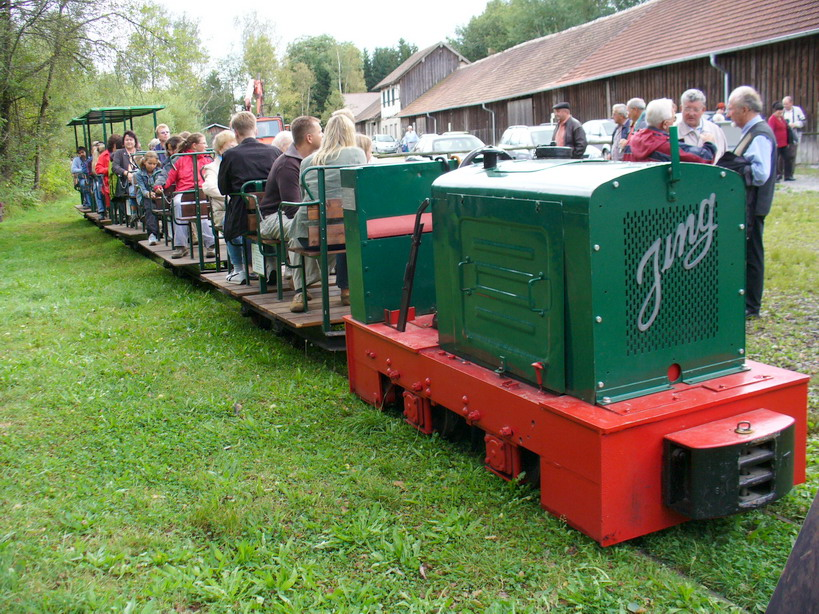
Peat railway in the Wurzacher Ried

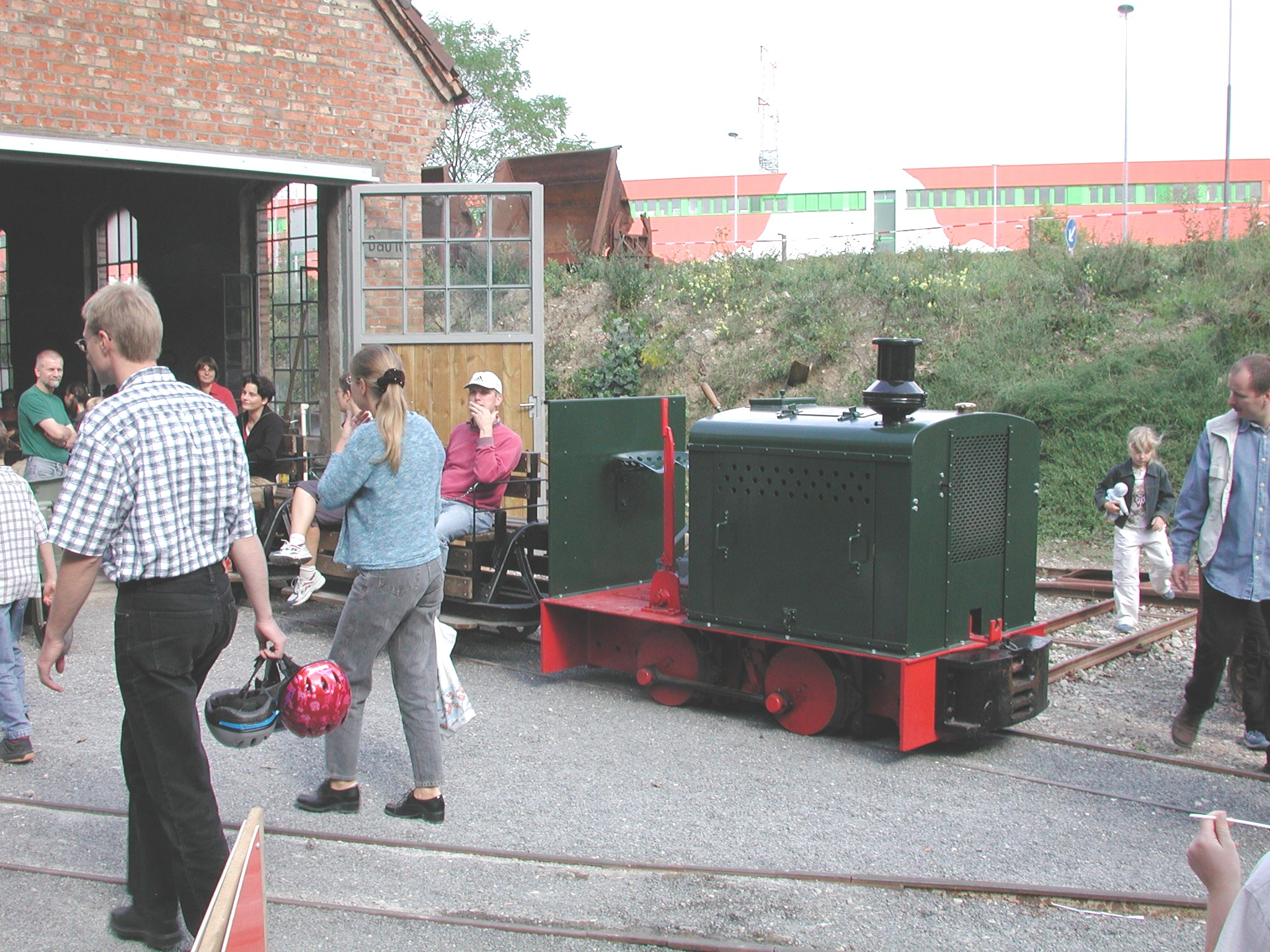
Wiesloch Feldbahnmuseum

- Bad Wurzach
- Buchen
- Mannheim Technoseum
- Neckarbischofsheim
- Spiegelberg
- Wiesloch Feldbahn and Industrial Museum

==== Bavaria ====
- Fürstenfeldbruck: Fürstenfeldbruck Model Railway Club
- Hengersberg
- Nuremberg: Feldbahn-Museum 500
- Rottau am Chiemsee: Bavarian Moor and Peat Museum
- Sankt Oswald-Riedlhütte: Riedlhütte Feldbahn and Waldbahn, 600 mm (1 ft 11 5/8 in), Length: 1 km (0.62 mi)
- Petersaurach/Rügland (Ansbach district): Franconian Feldbahn Museum

==== Berlin ====
- Berlin – FEZ Wuhlheide: 500 mm (19 3/4 in) Feldbahn project at FEZ Wuhlheide
- Berlin – Britzer Garten: 600 mm (1 ft 11 5/8 in) museum railway (built from Feldbahn components on the former BUGA site, several vehicles are replicas of historic prototypes)

==== Brandenburg ====
- Mildenberg: Mildenberg Brickworks Park, 2 clay tipper railways, 500 mm (19 3/4 in) and 630 mm (24 13/16 in)

==== Hesse ====
- Frankfurt am Main: Frankfurt Feldbahn Museum
- Eichenberg: Eichenberger Waldbahn
- Bad Schwalbacher Kurbahn
- Solms–Oberbiel: Feldbahn and Fortuna Pit Railway Museum
- Bad Orber Light Railway: reactivated in 2002 with a Feldbahn track

==== Mecklenburg-Vorpommern ====
- Alt Schwerin: Historical Agriculture Museum
- Bad Sülze: salt museum, peat railway

==== Lower Saxony ====
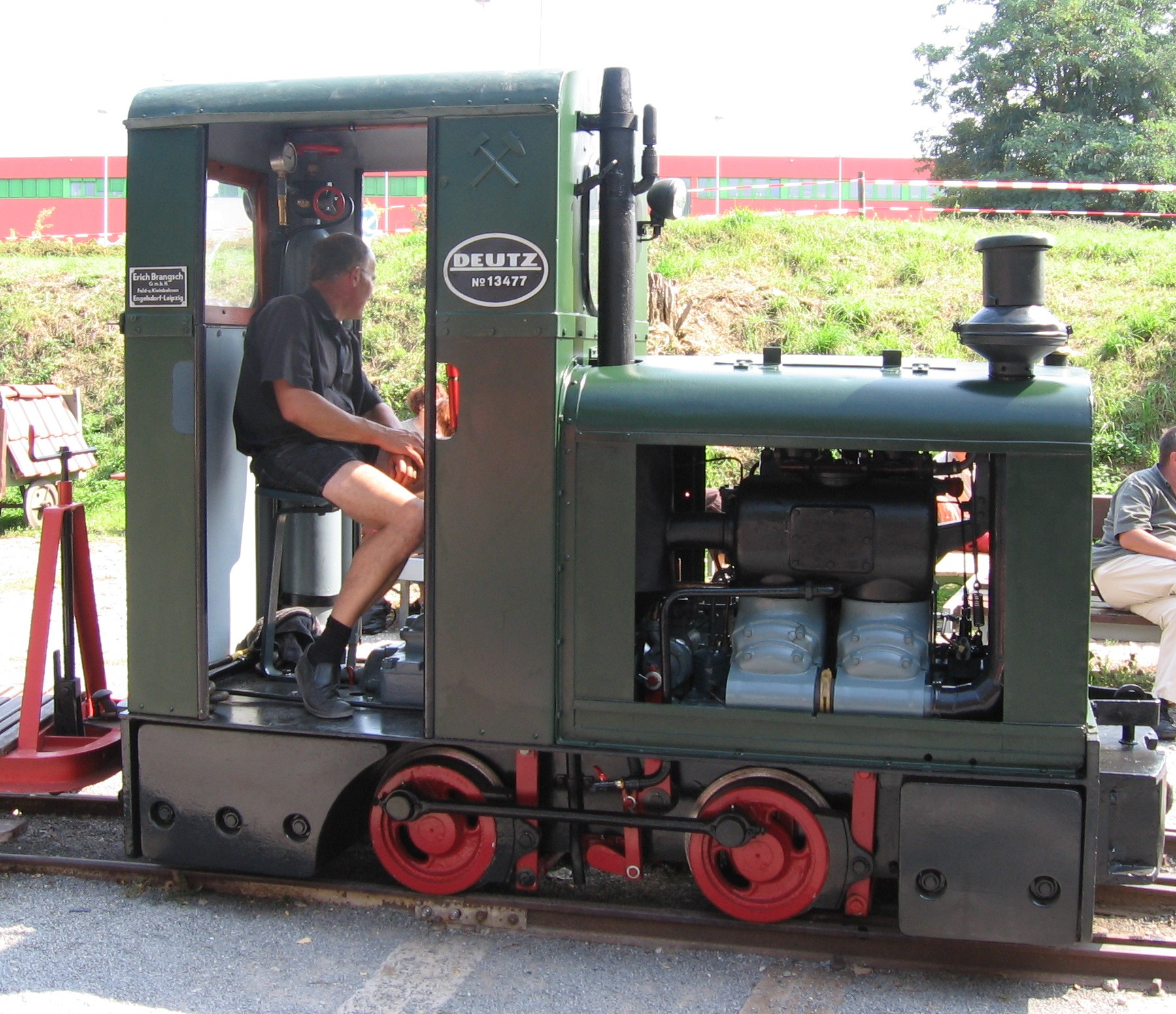
Deutz OMZ 117F with 2 cylinders

- Baltrum: island railway for luggage transportation, 1949–1985
- Burgsittensen: Burgsittensen Moor Railway
- Deinste: German Feldbahn and Kleinbahn Museum
- Diepenau: Uchter Moor Railway
- Drochtersen–Aschhorn: Moorkieker Moor Railway
- Essern: Essern Moor Railway
- Fredenbeck-Wedel: Wedel Feldbahn
- Freistatt–Heimstatt: deaconry
- Flögeln: Ahlenmoor Moor Railway
- Goldenstedt-Arkeburg: Nature information centre
- Groß-Hesepe: Emsland Moor Museum
- Hildesheim: Hildesheim Feldbahn Museum
- Minsener Oog – Minsener Oog Coastal Defence Railway (Lorenbahn for light goods traffic)
- Neustadt am Rübenberge
- Ostercappeln-Hitzhausen: museum for narrow-gauge industrial railways
- Sassenburg-Westerbeck: moor railway and Euflor Peat Works (part of the moor nature trail at www.moorlehrpfad.de)
- Saterland–Ramsloh: moor railway services, Koch Peat Works
- Wiesmoor: Peat and Settlers Museum

==== North Rhine-Westphalia ====
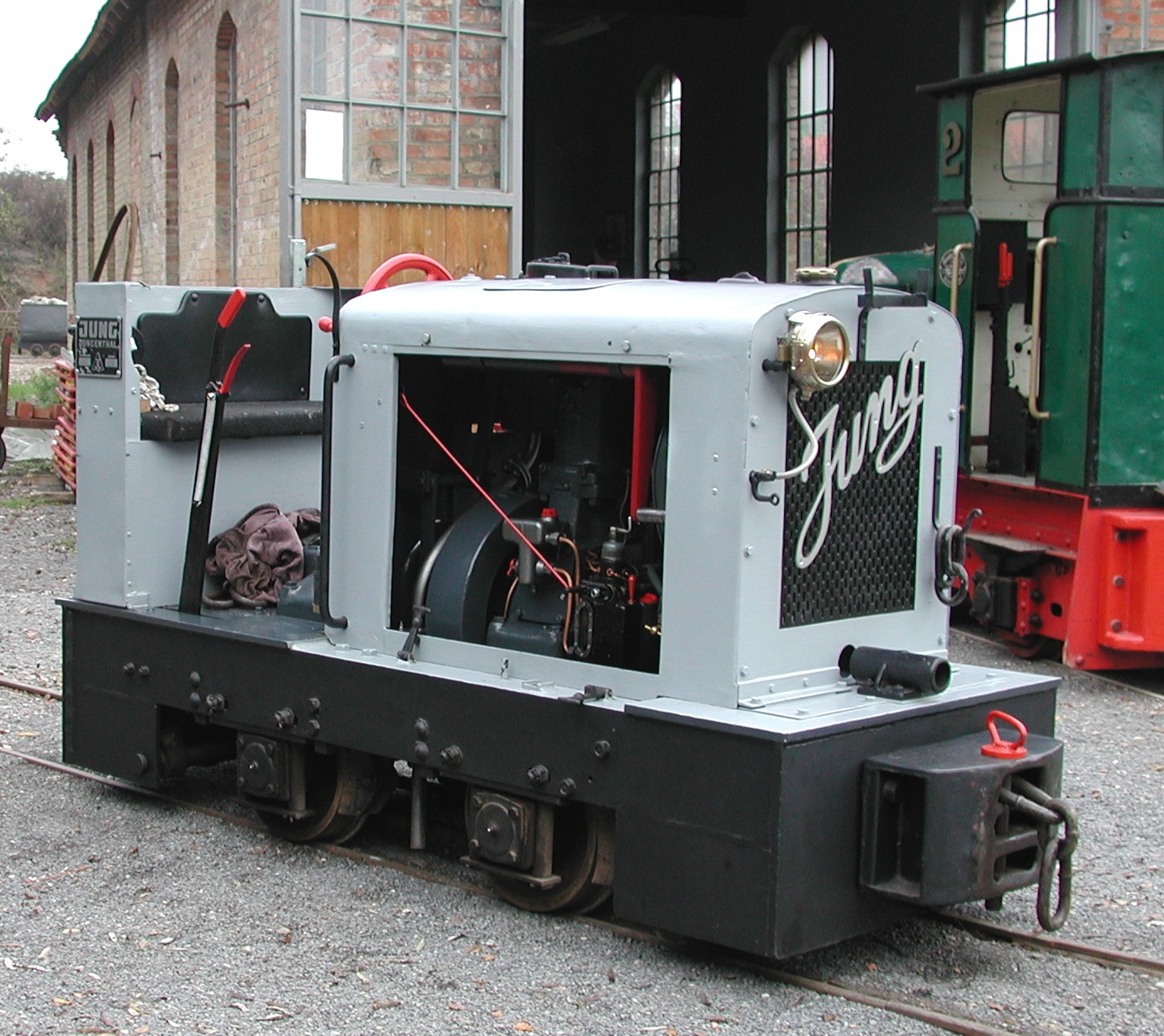
Jung 600 mm Feldbahn engine

- Lengerich Lengerich Railway Society
- Lage: Feldbahn in the WIM »Lage Brickworks«
- Oekoven: Feldbahn museum
- Witten-Bommern: Theresia Mine Pit and Feldbahn Museum
- Bochum-Dahlhausen Railway Museum
- Schermbeck-Gahlen Feldbahn
- Eslohe Mechanical and Local History Museum

==== Rhineland-Palatinate ====
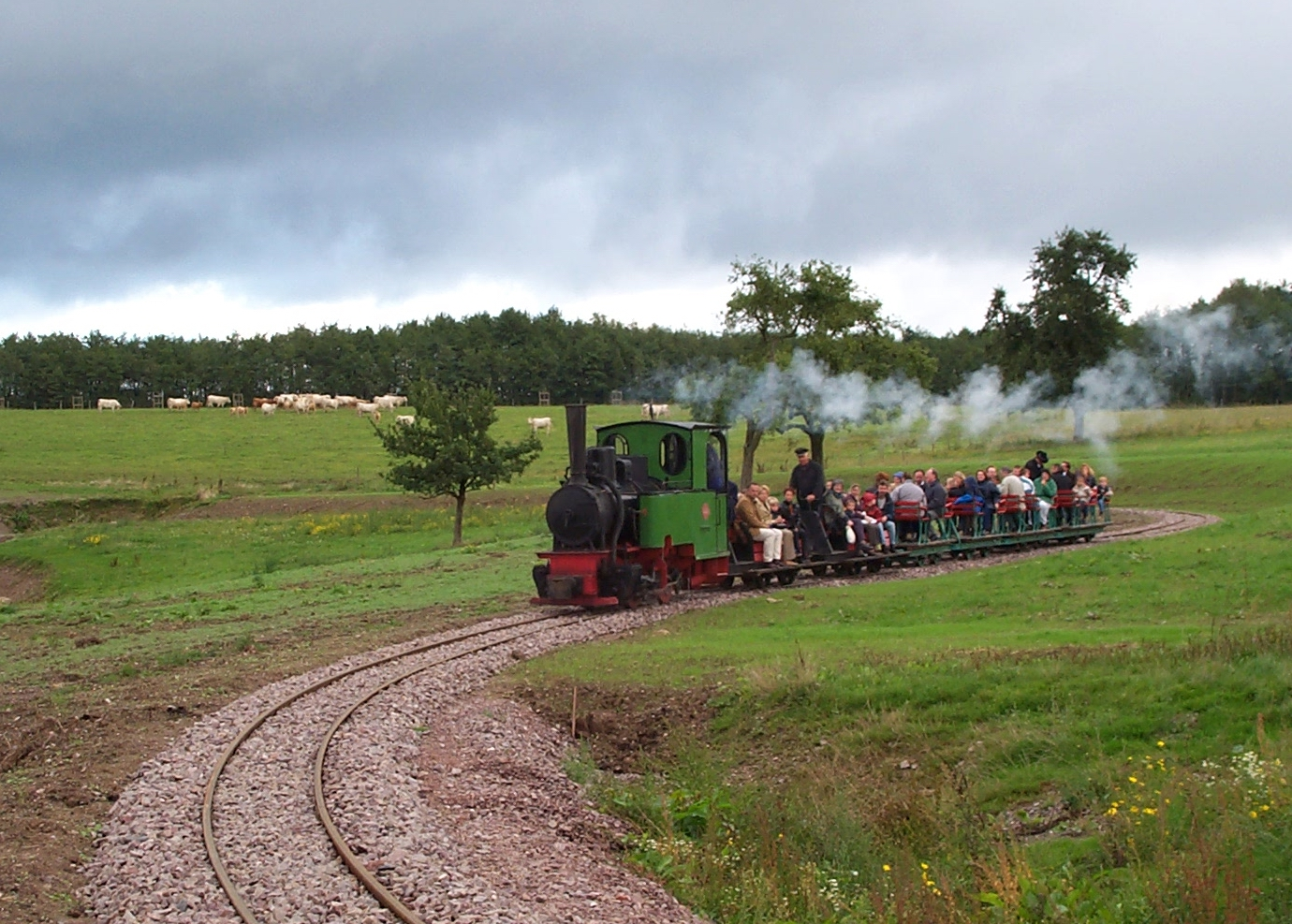
Feldbahn on the Serrig farm (former Feldbahn of the state vineyard estate in Serrig)

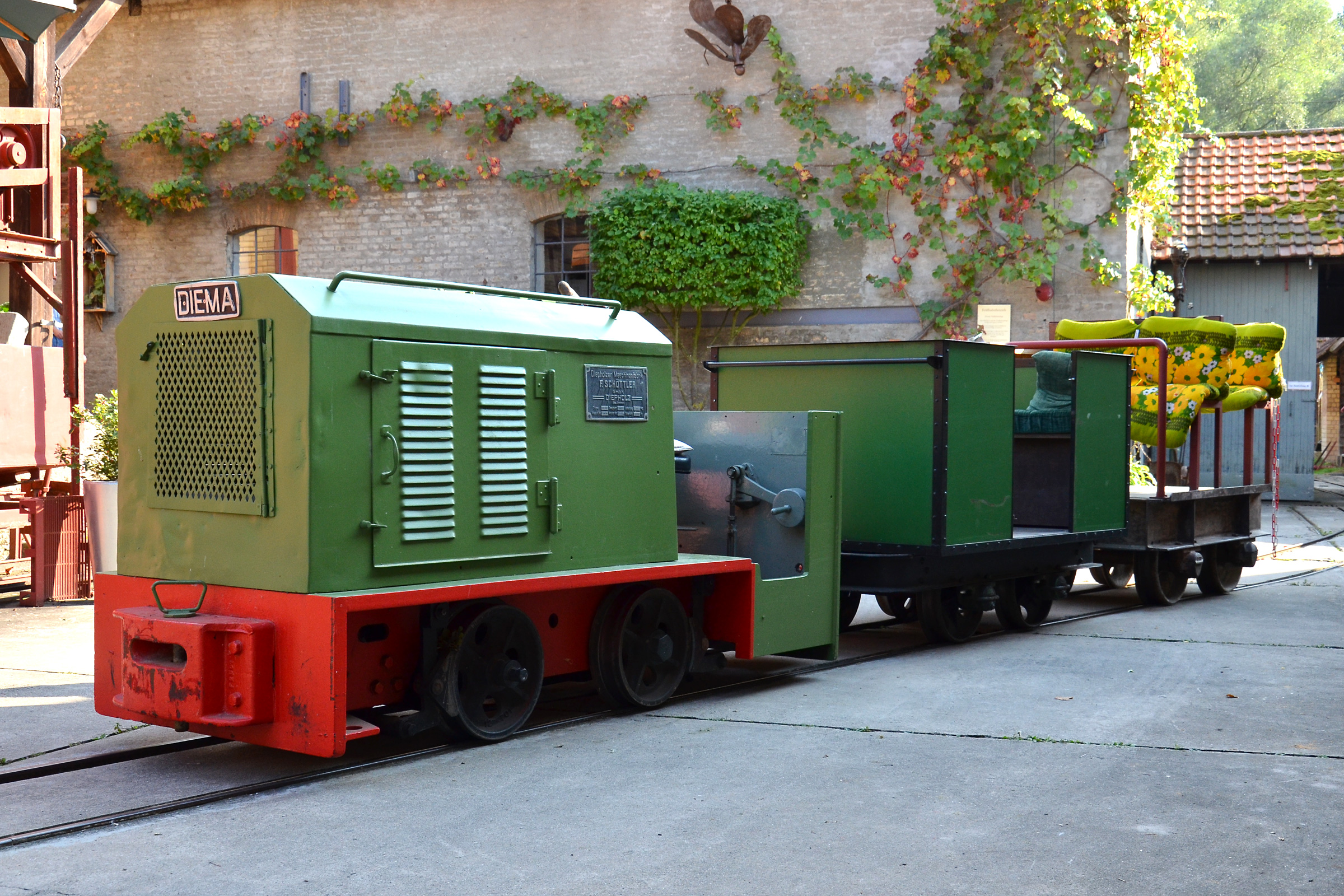
Feldbahn at the brickyard museum Sondernheim

- Bad Ems: Pit railway in the Ems Mining Museum
- Guldental
- Ramsen (Pfalz): Waldbahn stub line
- Serrig: estate
- Sondernheim: brickyard museum (Ziegeleimuseum Sondernheim)

==== Saxony ====
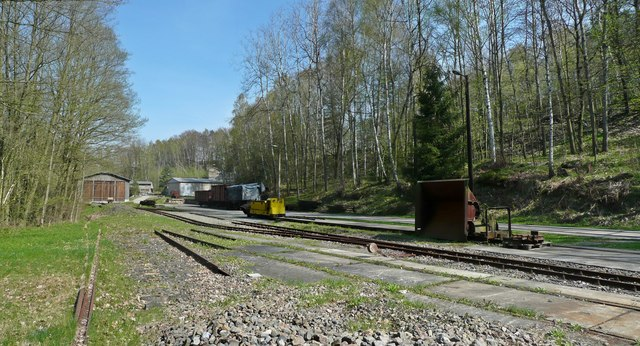
Saxony: View of the Feldbahn Museum in Herrenleite

- Chemnitz: Feldbahn in the Saxon Railway Museum
- Glossen bei Oschatz: Feldbahn viewing point
- Leipzig-Lindenau: Museum 'Feldbahn, 800 mm (2 ft 7 1/2 in)
- Lindenau (Radebeul): Radebeul-Lindenau sawmill Feldbahn
- Löbau: Werner‘s Garden Railway
- Lohmen: Herrenleite Feldbahn Museum, Dresden Historic Feldbahn
- Niederwürschnitz (bei Chemnitz): "Old Brickworks" Feldbahn

==== Saxony-Anhalt ====
- Elbingerode: pit railway
- Bennstedt: Feldbahn under construction
- Schlanstedt: Schlanstedt Historic Feldbahn
- Bad Dürrenberg: 1836 opening of the Tollwitz–Dürrenberger Feldbahn (4.5 km or 2.8 mi) with the first German railway tunnel (133 m or 145 yd)

==== Schleswig-Holstein ====
- Aumühle near Hamburg: 600 mm (1 ft 11 5/8 in) Feldbahn on the terrain of the Verein Verkehrsamateure und Museumsbahn:de:
- Bad Bramstedt
- Bad Malente Gremsmühlen
- Neritz-Flogensee, chicken farm, 600 mm (1 ft 11 5/8 in), length 300 m (330 yd)
- Tolk-Schau in Tolk near Schleswig (Stadt)
- Nordstrandischmoor island: Lüttmoorsiel-Nordstrandischmoor island railway
- The line to the halligs of Oland and Langeneß are built to a 900 mm (2 ft 11 7/16 in) gauge which is uncommon amongst Feldbahnen. (however the definition of a Feldbahn is not a question of gauge, but rather of purpose and operation.)
- Buchhorster Waldbahn, as museum railway operated remaining line of the former brickworks and matchworks near Lauenburg an der Elbe.

==== Thuringia ====
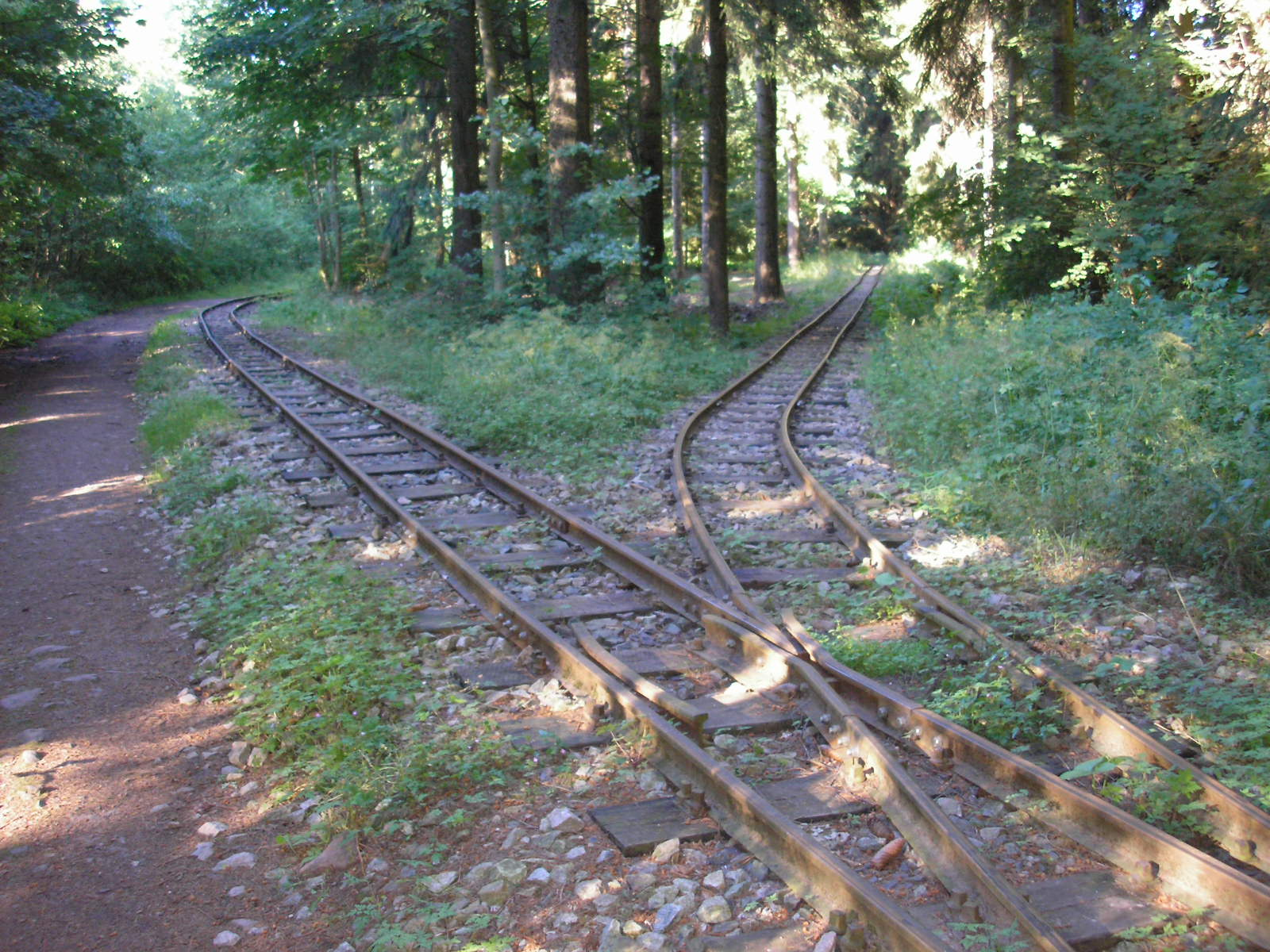
Tracks of the Lorenbahn in the Schorte valley near Ilmenau

- Ilfeld – Netzkater: pit railway
- Ilmenau: in the Volle Rose Show Mine
- Lichtenhain: Waldeisenbahn
- Trusetal: Hühn Pit – pit railway

=== Austria ===
- Lower Austria: Freiland in Türnitz, Feldbahn and industrial railway museum
- Lower Austria: Schwarzau im Gebirge, Rotte Naßwald: Naßwald Waldbahn (closed in 2008)
- Lower Austria: Schwechat, Schwechat Railway Museum
- Upper Austria: Wels, Scholz Feldbahn
- Vienna: Geriatriezentrum Am Wienerwald Feldbahn (closed 2011)
- Salzburg: Diabasbahn Saalfelden (closed in 2008 and replaced by a standard-gauge line)
- Salzburg: Großgmain Museum Feldbahn (rebuilt in 2009)

=== Austria/Switzerland ===
- Lustenau: International Rhine Control Railway (Bahn der internationalen Rheinregulierung)

=== Switzerland ===
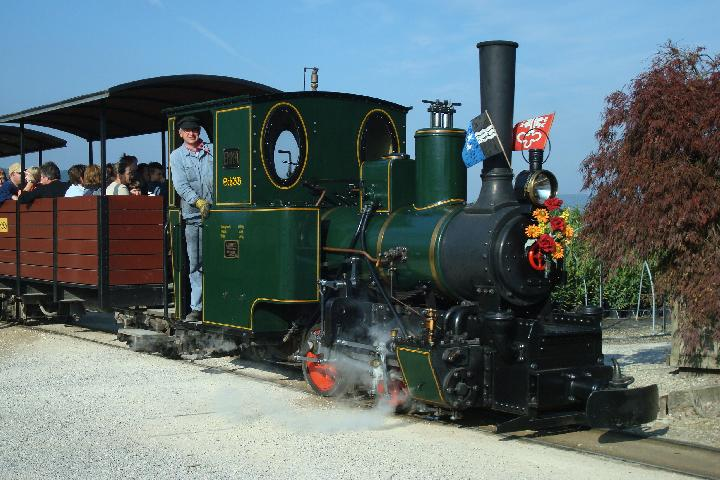
Steam locomotive Emma of the Schinznach Nursery Railway in autumn 2008 (www.schbb.ch)

- Schinznach-Dorf: Schinznach Nursery Railway (www.schbb.ch)
- Otelfingen: Swiss Feldbahn and Werkbahn Society

=== Belgium ===
- Pairi Daiza zoo passenger steam train.

=== Czech Republic ===
- Kolínská řepařská drážka: sugar beet line (Rübenbahn)

=== Hungary ===
- Balatonfenyves narrow-gauge railway, museum railway
- Fishery Railway Hortobágy, museum railway
- Kecskemét Little Railway, museum railway only with draisine
- Nyírvidék Little Railway, closed in 2009
- Fishery Railway Szeged, active fishery railway
- Fishery Railway Tömörkény, closed in 2021

=== Norway ===
- Kristiansand Kanonmuseum. Former ammunition railroad to Marinenküstenbatterie 6./502 "Vara" (Norwegian name: Mövik fort). Built around 1941-1942, partially decommissioned around 1960. Restored back to running order in June 2016.

== See also ==
- Decauville railway
- Forest railway
- Heeresfeldbahn – German and Austrian military field railways
- History of rail transport in Germany
- Industrial railway
- Light railway
- War Department Light Railways
