= Fürberg (Bavarian Forest) =

Mountain in Germany

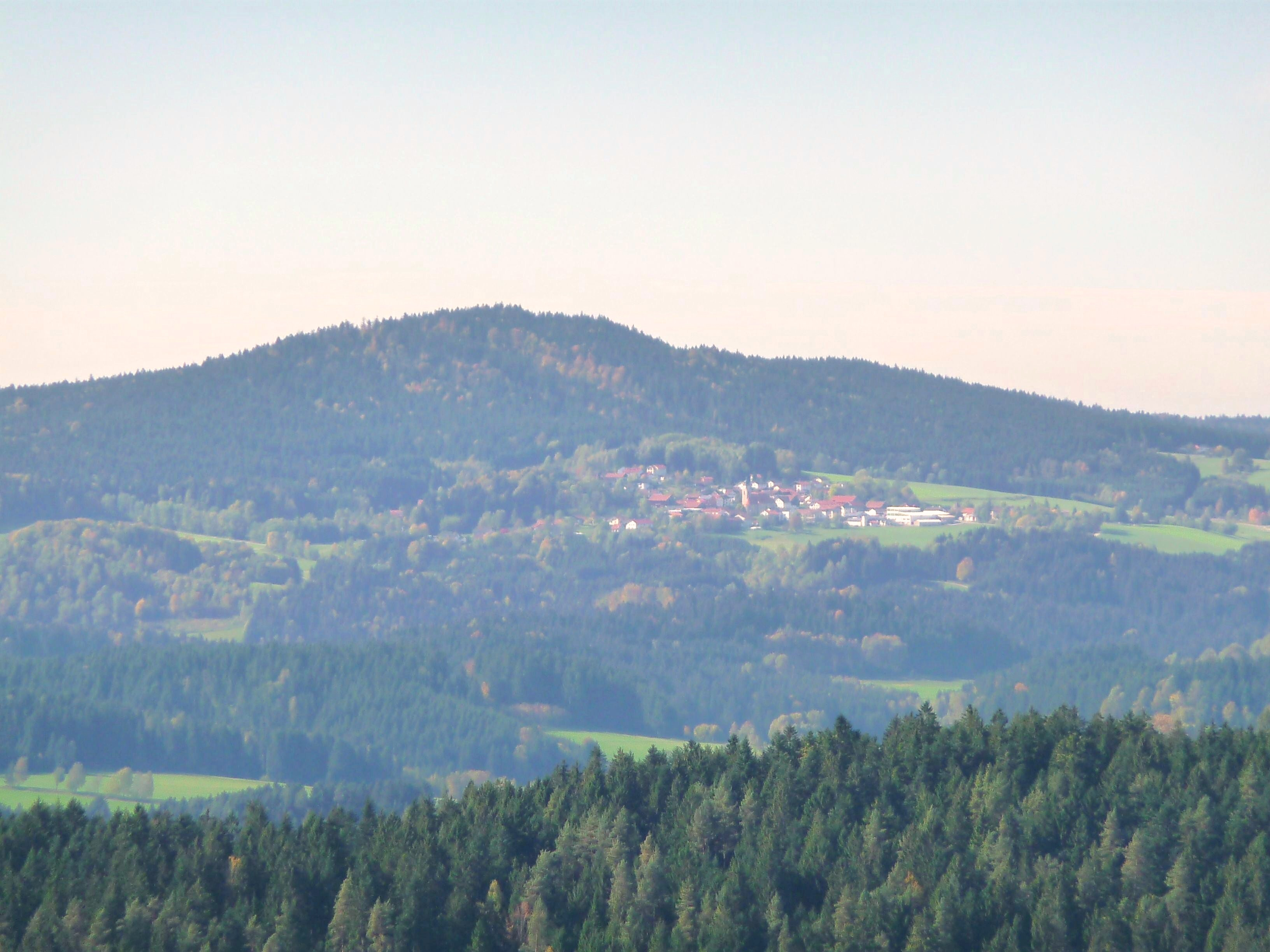
- The Fürberg and the village of Untermitterdorf seen from the Oberkreuzberg viewing tower

Highest point
- Elevation: 880 m (2,890 ft)
- Coordinates: 48°52′14″N 13°12′45″E

Geography
- Location within Bavaria
- Location: Bavaria, Germany
- Parent range: Bavarian Forest

Geology
- Rock type: granite

The 880-metre-high Fürberg is one of the smaller mountains in the Danube Hills, the lower part of the Bavarian Forest. It rises in the municipality of Kirchberg im Wald.

At the summit is the Plattenstein, an interesting rock formation with a summit cross and view southwards to the higher Brotjacklriegel. A little further below is the Fürberg Chapel, which can be reached by walking along the Stations of the Cross from Untermitterdorf. The Fürberg can be climbed on various footpaths in a short time from the small villages of Raindorf, Untermitterdorf or Berneck.
