= Spiegelau =

- Municipality
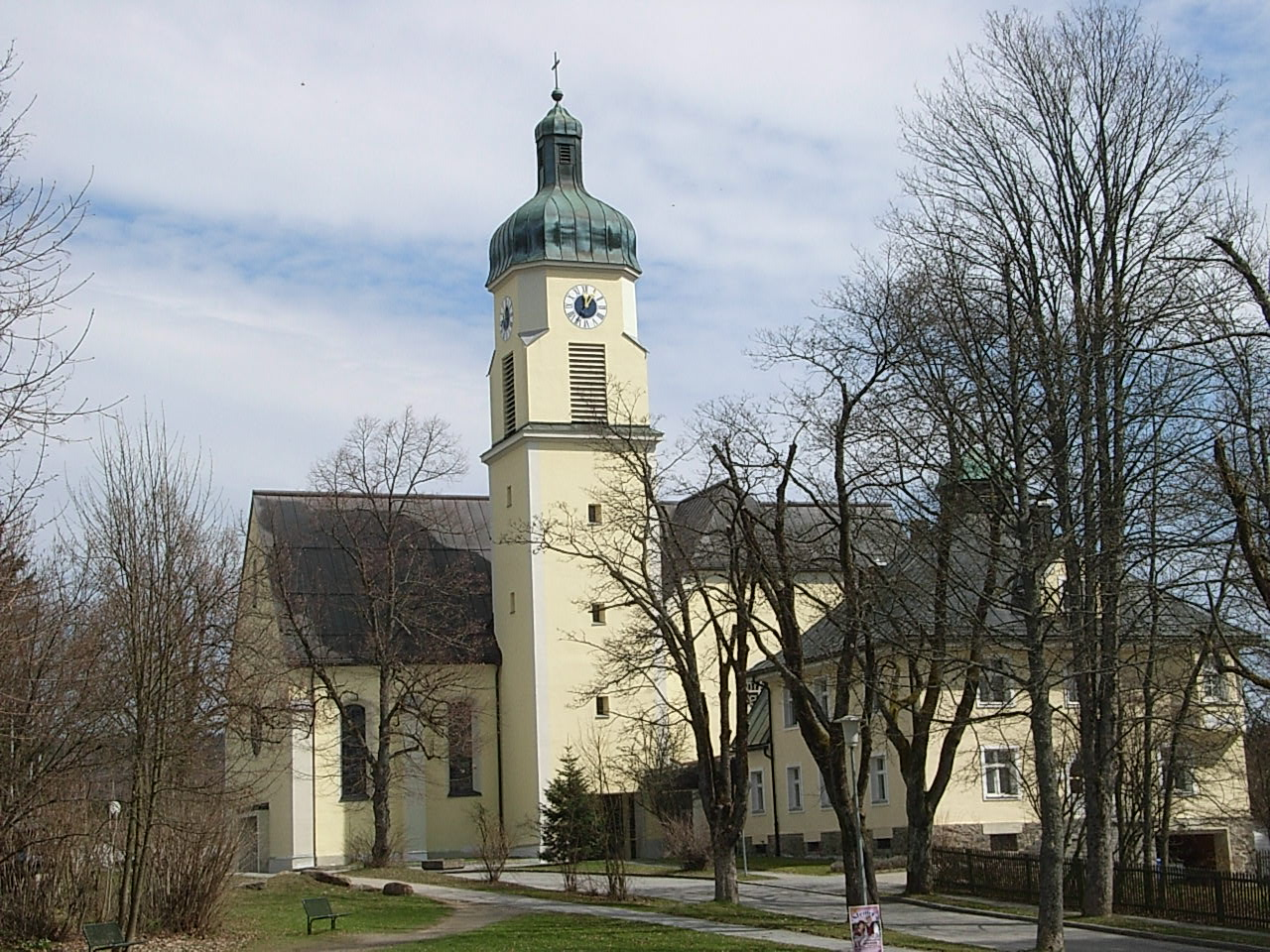
- Roman Catholic parish church of Saint John the Baptist

- Coat of arms

- Location of Spiegelau within Freyung-Grafenau district
- Interactive map of Spiegelau
- Location within Germany Location within Bavaria
- Coordinates: 48°55′N 13°22′E
- Country: Germany
- State: Bavaria
- Admin. region: Niederbayern
- District: Freyung-Grafenau

Government
  - Mayor (2020–26): Karlheinz Roth (CSU)

Area
  - Total: 40.42 km^{2} (15.61 sq mi)
- Elevation: 734–820 m (2,408–2,690 ft)

Population (2025-12-31)
  - Total: 3,892
  - Density: 96.29/km^{2} (249.4/sq mi)
- Time zone: UTC+01:00 (CET)
  - Summer (DST): UTC+02:00 (CEST)
- Postal codes: 94518
- Dialling codes: 08553
- Vehicle registration: FRG
- Website: www.gemeinde-spiegelau.de

Spiegelau is a municipality in the district of Freyung-Grafenau in Bavaria in Germany. It lies in the heart of the Bavarian Forest.

== Subdivisions ==
There are 33 villages in the municipality:

- Althütte
- Augrub
- Beiwald
- Flanitzhütte
- Hauswald
- Hirschöd
- Hirschschlag
- Hirschthalmühle
- Hochreuth
- Holzhammer
- Holzmühle
- Jägerfleck
- Kirchenberg
- Klingenbrunn
- Kronreuth
- Langdorf
- Luisenfels
- Mühlberg
- Neuhütte
- Oberkreuzberg
- Ochsenkopf
- Palmberg
- Pronfelden
- Rehbruck (PLZ 94481)
- Reinhardschlag
- Reuteck
- Ringen
- Sommerau
- Spiegelau
- Steinbüchl
- Winkelhof
- Winkelmühle
- Winkelreuth

There are also the Gemarkungen of Spiegelau, Oberkreuzberg and Klingenbrunn.

== Transport ==
Spiegelau lies on Zwiesel–Grafenau railway and its station was formerly the junction to the Spiegelau Forest Railway which supporting the major logging industry in the area.

== See also ==
- Bavarian Forest National Park
