= Geriatriezentrum Am Wienerwald Feldbahn =

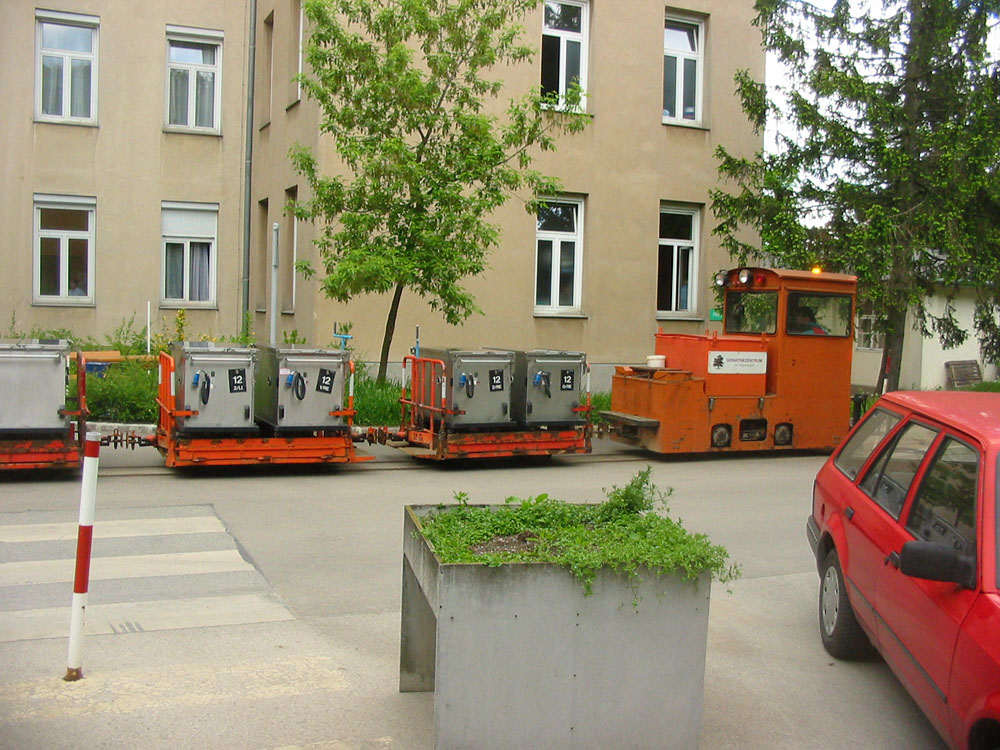
Food container waggons with locomotive

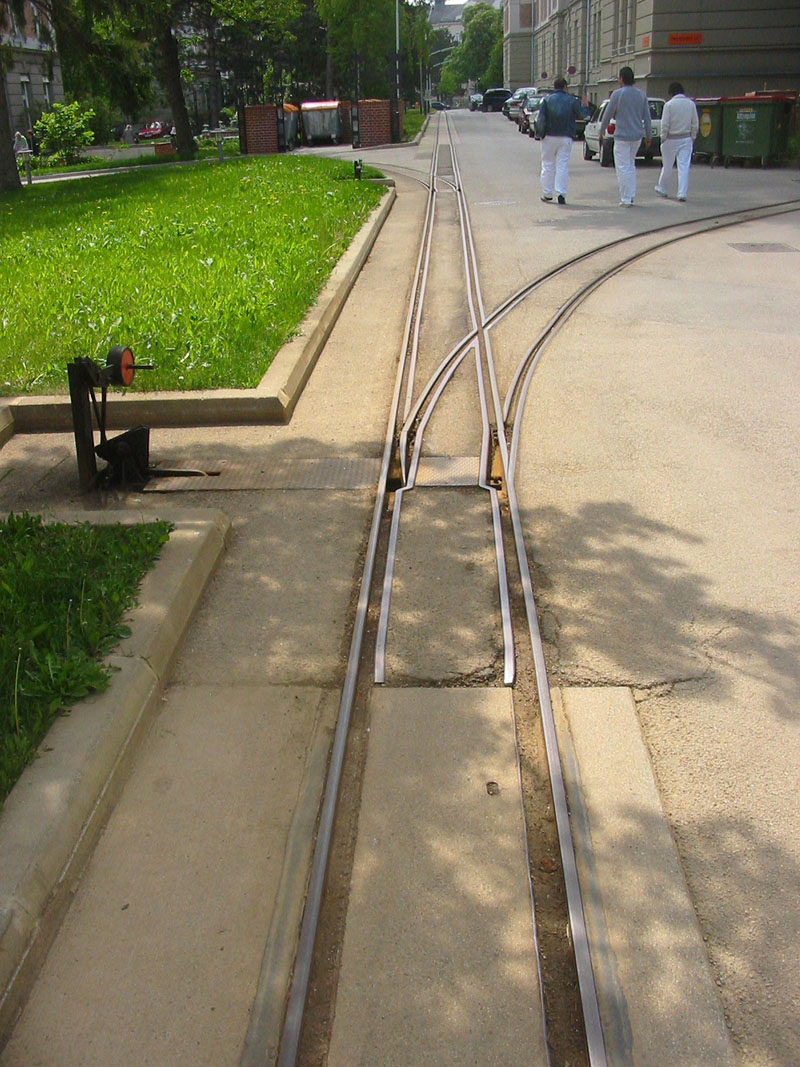
Track with turnout to pavilion

The Geriatriezentrum Am Wienerwald Feldbahn (Geriatric nursing center Wienerwald) was a 500 mm (19 3/4 in) minimum-gauge railway constructed in 1904. It is located at the premises of the former nursing home Lainz in the 13th District of Vienna, Hietzing. Until its closure in 2011 it was the oldest feldbahn in use in Austria.

== History ==
For the supply of clothes, food and fuel to the nursing home Lainz, the Vienna City Administration decided to construct a manually operated narrow-gauge railway. The Lehmann & Leyer company constructed a 4 km network with a track gauge of 500 mm (19 3/4 in), with a base made of steel sleepers and flat bottom rails. The work was completed in three months. At the crossing points of the tracks as well as the branches to the pavilions 61 cast-iron turntables were constructed.

In 1925, the construction company Langfelder & Sohn was commissioned to replace all turntables by switches and to lay grooved rails at the intersections with the local tramway. Furthermore, four battery locomotives were bought from AEG. These were replaced by new battery powered engines in 1981. The railway was also equipped with new flat waggons with a handbrake on one side.

In 1966 a new diesel Locomotive type JW 15 was acquired from the Jenbacher Werke. It was used for snow removal, work trains and functioned as a back-up replacement for the battery locomotives. At the end of the operations in 2011, the train was only used for food transport, which took place two or three times a day.

Operation of the train ceased on 27 November 2011. Since the tracks are partially listed as industrial heritage they were preserved, but the engine sheds were demolished.
