= Riedlhütte narrow-gauge railway =

Light railway in Bavaria, Germany

Coordinates: 48°54′19.93″N 13°23′06.56″E

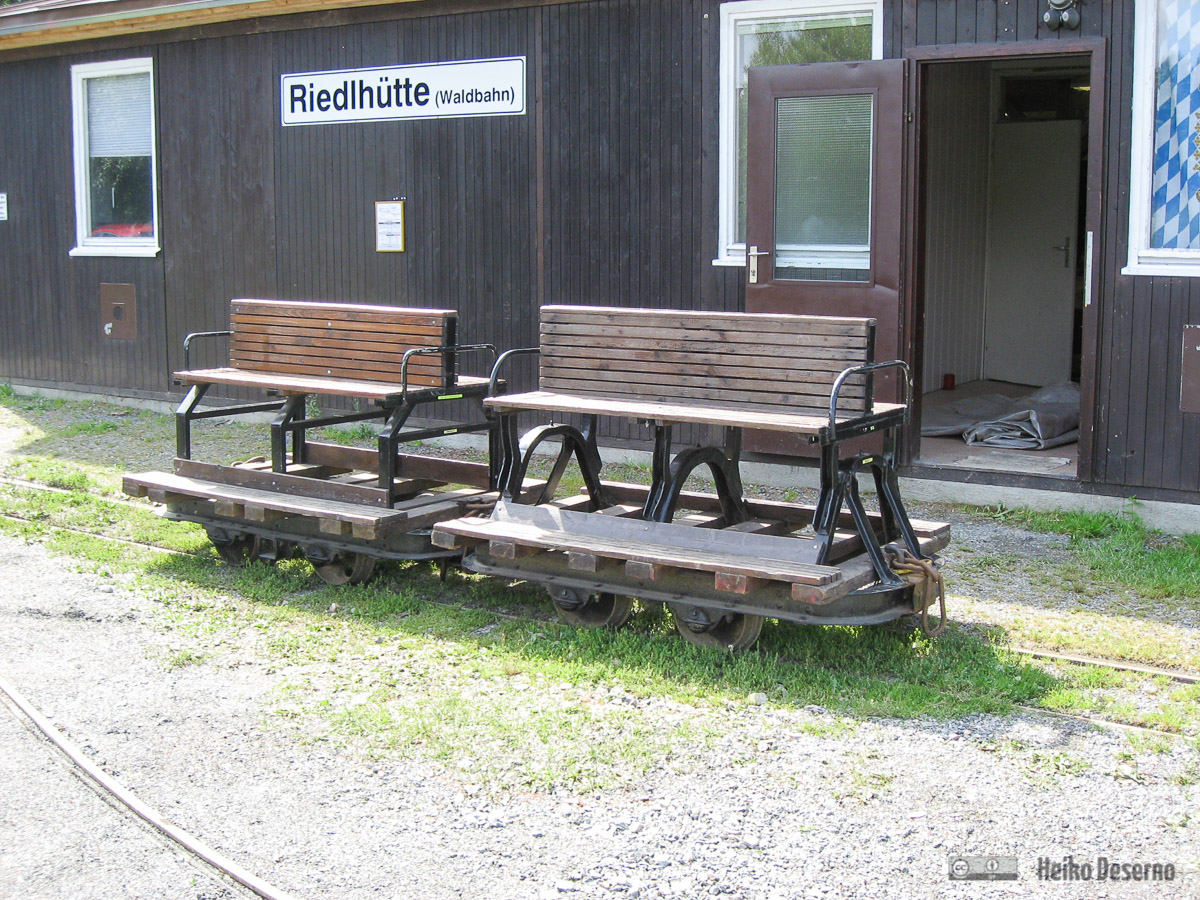
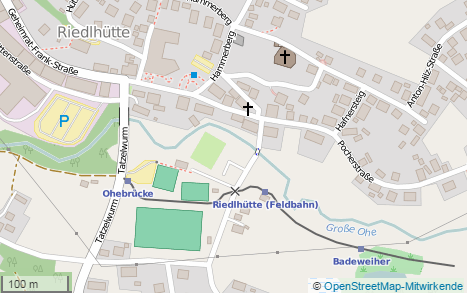
- Riedlhütte station Track of the Riedlhütte narrow-gauge railway

Technical
- Line length: 1 km (0.6 miles)
- Track gauge: 600 mm (1 ft 11 5/8 in)

The Riedlhütte narrow-gauge railway (German: Feld- und Waldbahn Riedlhütte e.V.) is a not-for-profit light railway in Sankt Oswald-Riedlhütte in the Bayerischer Wald, Bavaria, Germany.

== Track ==
The 1-kilometre (0.62 mi) track has a gauge of 600 mm (1 ft 11 5/8 in) and runs in an east-west direction. There are four stations: Ohebrücke near the parking lot, Riedlhütte at the club house, Badeweiher at the lake and Krummwiese.

== Operation ==
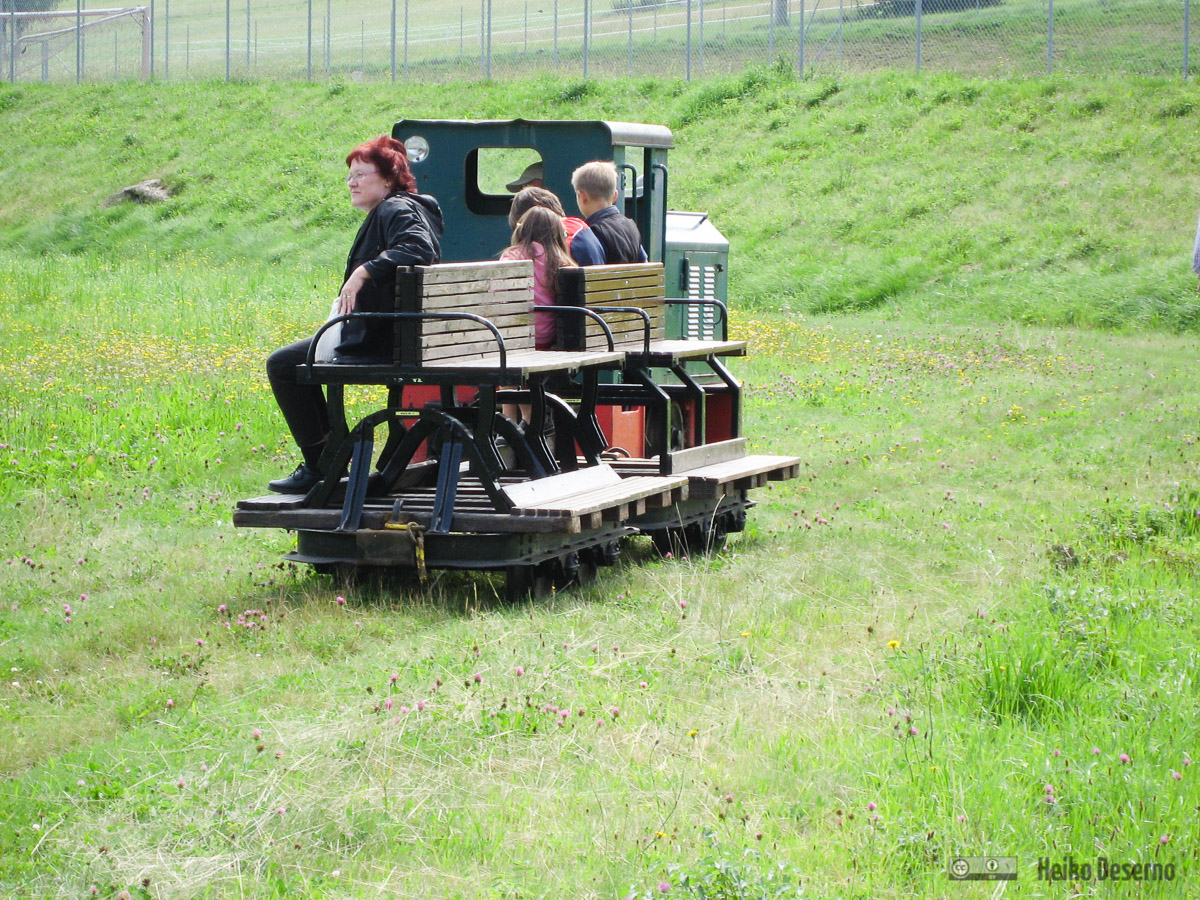
Passenger train

The railway operates approximately 16 days per year, and if weather conditions permit, several trains will be in use.

The trains depart from 10:00 to 16:00 or 17:00 from the central station Riedlhütte. For the return trip they need altogether 18 min.

== History ==
The association was funded in 1987 as Feldbahn Fränking in Weichs-Fränking, north of Munich. It built a 400 m (1,300 ft) long track at the Deutsches Museum in Munich in 1996, on which they run trains between Ludwigsbrücke and the museum entrance. In 2002 the association relocated to Sankt Oswald-Riedlhütte, where the parish provided a suitable site.

== Rolling stock ==
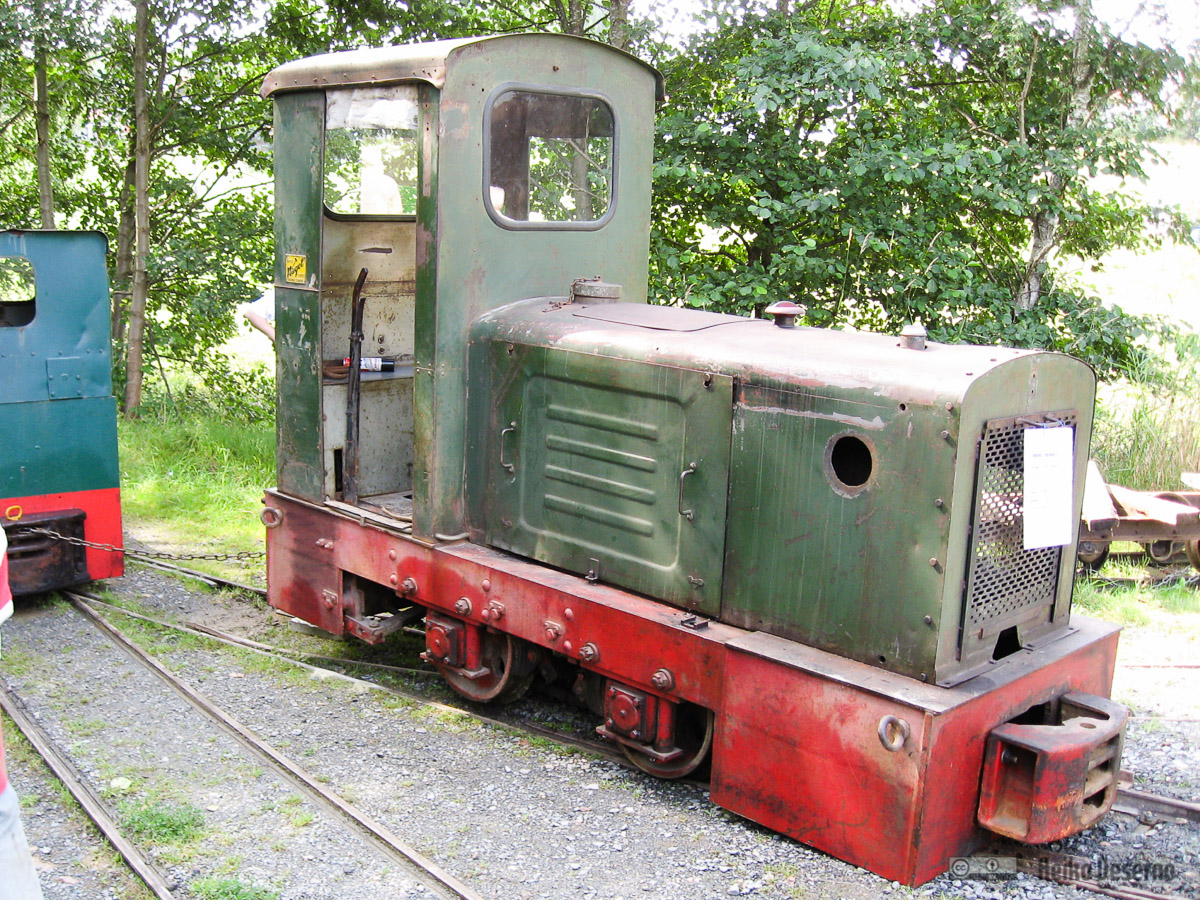
Diesel locomotive

The railway operates with ten diesel locomotives of four manufacturers (three Jung, three Gmeinder, three Diema and one Lkm). Most of the locos are ready to be used, but normally only up to 3 will be used on one day. There are also some goods and passenger cars and some auxiliary vehicles.
