= Lake Fehér (Szeged) =

Lake in Csongrád County, Hungary

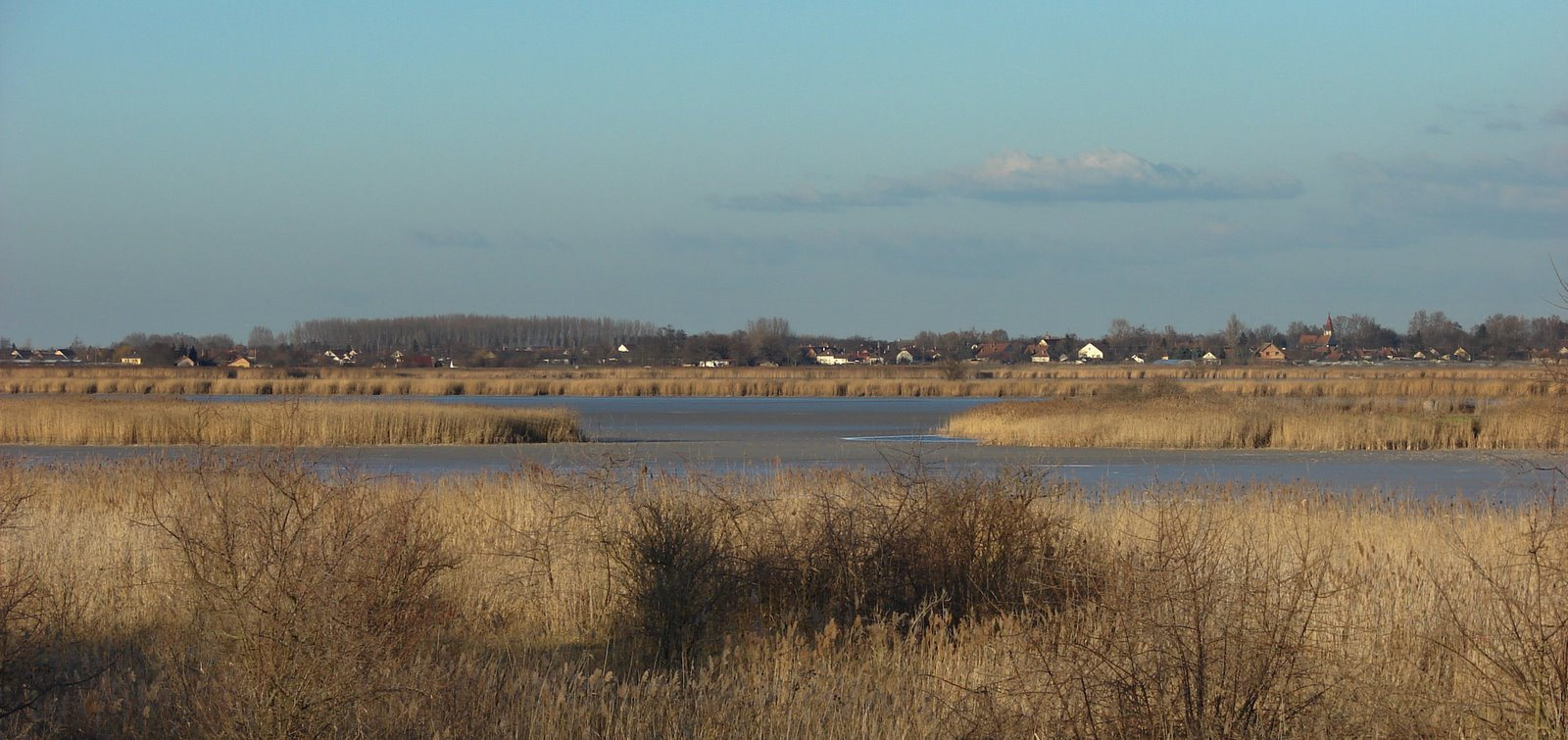
- View of Fehér-tó

- Location within Hungary
- Location: Europe
- Coordinates: 46.3263°N 20.0984°E
- Type: brackish
- Basin countries: Hungary
- Surface area: 14 km^{2} (5.4 sq mi)

Lake Fehér is a lake of Hungary. It is named Fehér (White), because it is white. It is a part of Kiskunság National Park, and it is situated just north of the town of Szeged. It covers an area of 14 square kilometres. Lake Fehér is Hungary's largest saltwater lake. It is carefully protected because it is home to 280 species of bird and because of its ancient flora. The area is an important stop in the migration of European birds, and serves as a resting and feeding place for them. During the migration season, crowds of cranes, wild geese, and teal varieties are visible on Lake Fehér.

The lake was officially mentioned for the first time in the year 1075. The Tisza River regularly flooded the area up to the early 19th century. The lake once began to the typical brackish lakes of the Great Hungarian Plain. The common property of these shallow, salty lakes is that their water is cloudy from the colloidal lime salts and a greyish-white carbonic lime silt accumulates on the lakebed. When the lakebed dries up, as it does partially occasionally, the salt "blossoms" on the lakebed.
