= Oberkreuzberg =

- Village of Spiegelau
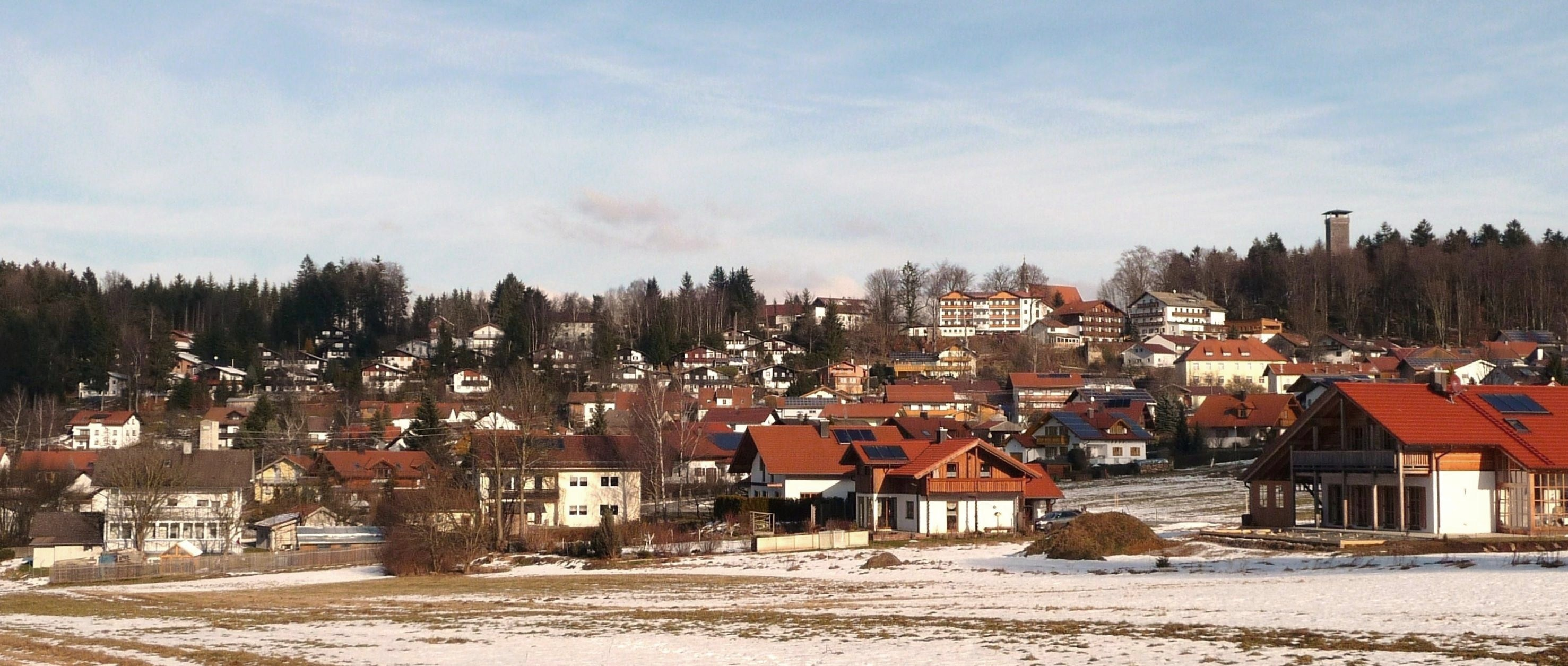
- Interactive map of Oberkreuzberg
- Location within Germany Location within Bavaria
- Coordinates: 48°53′38″N 13°20′42″E
- Country: Germany
- State: Bavaria
- District: Freyung-Grafenau
- Municipality: Spiegelau
- Elevation: 753 m (2,470 ft)

Population (2011)
  - Total: 620
- Time zone: UTC+01:00 (CET)
  - Summer (DST): UTC+02:00 (CEST)
- Postal codes: 94518
- Dialling codes: 08553

Oberkreuzberg is a village in the municipality of Spiegelau in the Lower Bavarian district of Freyung-Grafenau in Germany. Until 1978 it was an independent municipality .

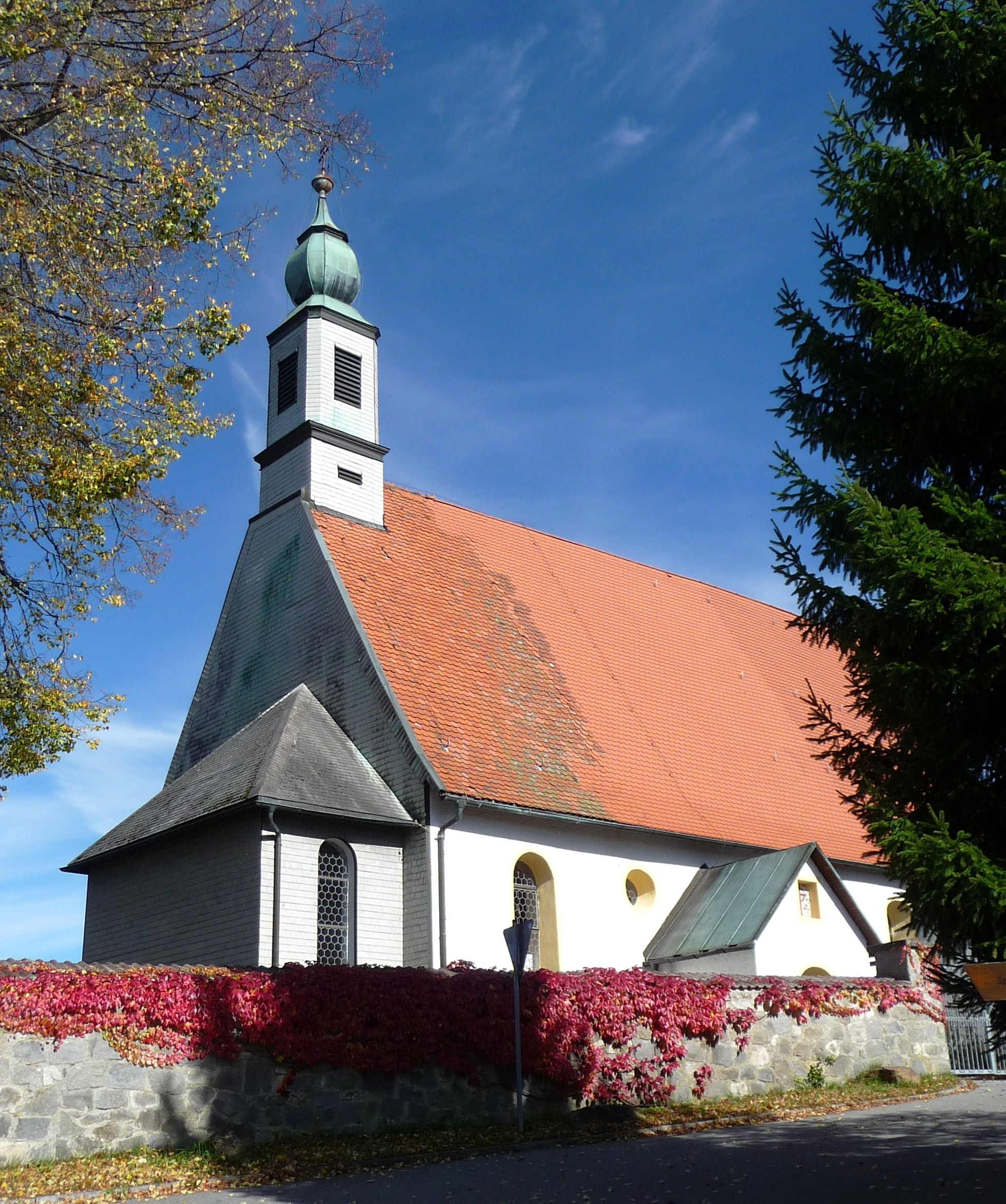
The parish church of St. Mary Magdalene

== Lage ==
The parish village (Pfarrdorf) lies at a height of 780 metres about 2 kilometres southwest of Spiegelau on the southern side of a mountain ridge up to 790 metres high with good views.

== Literature ==
- Ulrich Pietrusky, Donatus Moosauer: Der Bayerische Wald – im Fluge neu entdeckt, Verlag Morsak, Grafenau, 1985, ISBN 3-87553-228-7
- Helmut Döringer: Vor 25 Jahren wurde Oberkreuzberg zu einem Teil der Gemeinde Spiegelau
