= Sankt Oswald-Riedlhütte =

- Municipality
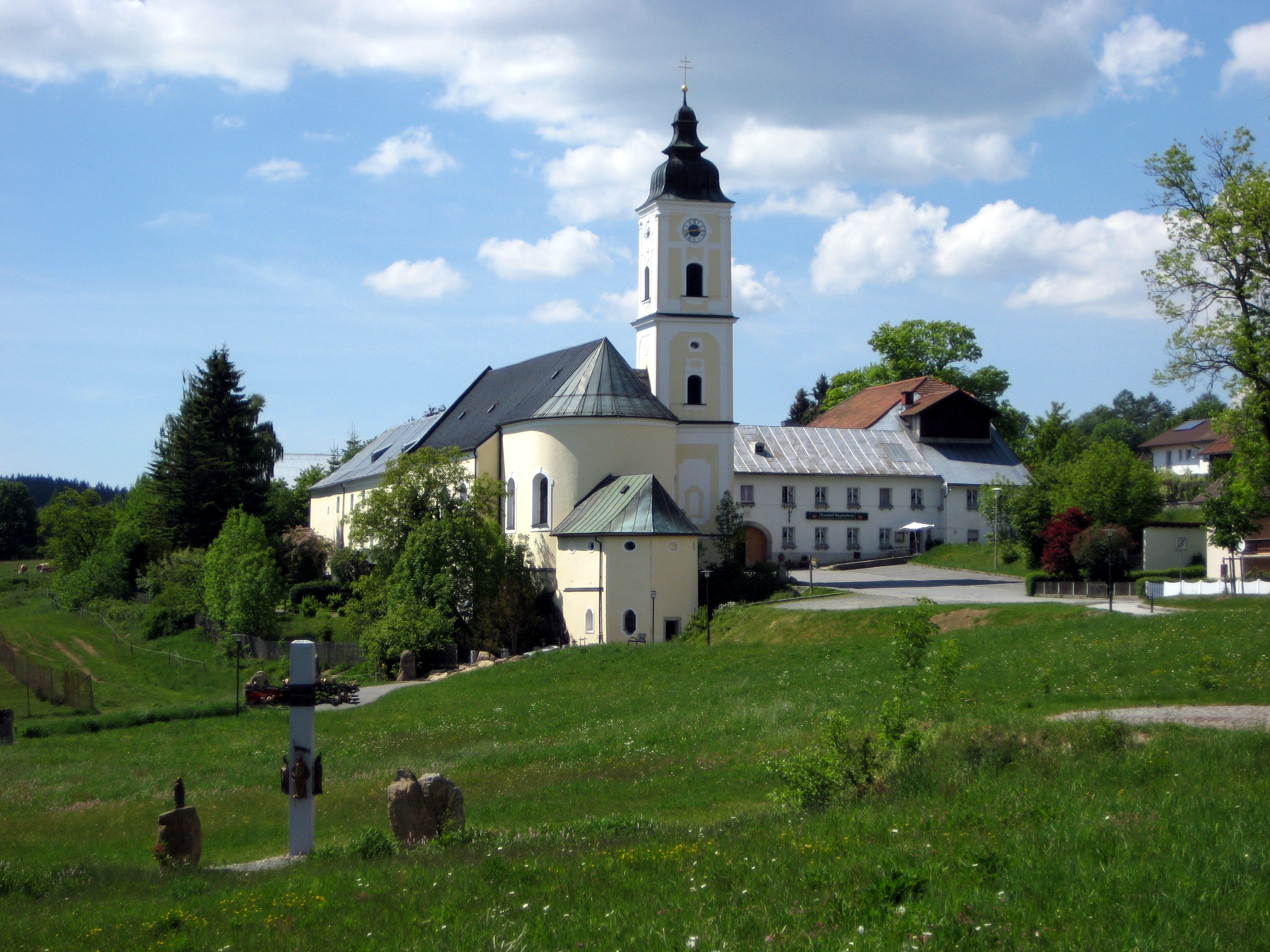
- Sankt Oswald Abbey

- Coat of arms

- Location of Sankt Oswald-Riedlhütte within Freyung-Grafenau district
- Interactive map of Sankt Oswald-Riedlhütte
- Location within Germany Location within Bavaria
- Coordinates: 48°53′N 13°25′E
- Country: Germany
- State: Bavaria
- Admin. region: Niederbayern
- District: Freyung-Grafenau
- Subdivisions: 8 Ortsteile

Government
  - Mayor (2022–28): Andreas Waiblinger (SPD)

Area
  - Total: 40.28 km^{2} (15.55 sq mi)
- Elevation: 791 m (2,595 ft)

Population (2025-12-31)
  - Total: 2,903
  - Density: 72.07/km^{2} (186.7/sq mi)
- Time zone: UTC+01:00 (CET)
  - Summer (DST): UTC+02:00 (CEST)
- Postal codes: 94566, 94568
- Dialling codes: 08553
- Vehicle registration: FRG
- Website: www.sankt-oswald-riedlhuette.de

Sankt Oswald-Riedlhütte is a municipality in the district of Freyung-Grafenau in Bavaria in Germany.
