= Administrative divisions of Kirov Oblast =

Kirov Oblast Russia
- Administrative centre: Kirov

Administrative structure (as of 2014)
- Districts: 39
- Cities/towns: 18
- Urban-type settlements: 40
- Selsovets: 269

Municipal structure (as of 2002)
- Rural settlements: 4,557 (inhabited); 773 (uninhabited)

Kirov Oblast is a federal subject of Russia.

== Administrative and municipal divisions ==
Map

Division		Structure		OKATO	OKTMO	Urban-type settlement/ district-level town*	Rural (rural okrug)
Division		Administrative	Municipal	OKATO	OKTMO	Urban-type settlement/ district-level town*	Rural (rural okrug)
Pervomaysky (Первомайский)		urban-type settlement (ZATO)	urban okrug	33 587	33 787		
Kirov (Киров)		city	urban okrug	33 401	33 701		
↳	Leninsky (Ленинский)	(under Kirov)	—N/a	33 401	—N/a		
↳	Novovyatsky (Нововятский)	(under Kirov)	—N/a	33 401	—N/a		
↳	Oktyabrsky (Октябрьский)	(under Kirov)	—N/a	33 401	—N/a		
↳	Pervomaysky (Первомайский)	(under Kirov)	—N/a	33 401	—N/a		
Vyatskiye Polyany (Вятские Поляны)		city	urban okrug	33 404	33 704		
Kirovo-Chepetsk (Кирово-Чепецк)		city	urban okrug	33 407	33 707		
Kotelnich (Котельнич)		city	urban okrug	33 410	33 710		
Slobodskoy (Слободской)		city	urban okrug	33 413	33 713		
Arbazhsky (Арбажский)		district	okrug	33 202	33 602	Arbazh (Арбаж)	4
Afanasyevsky (Афанасьевский)		district		33 203	33 603	Afanasyevo (Афанасьево)	6
Belokholunitsky (Белохолуницкий)		district		33 205	33 605	Belaya Kholunitsa (Белая Холуница) town*	10
Bogorodsky (Богородский)		district	okrug	33 206	33 606	Bogorodskoye (Богородское)	1
Verkhnekamsky (Верхнекамский)		district		33 207	33 607	Kirs (Кирс) town*; Lesnoy (Лесной); Rudnichny (Рудничный); Svetlopolyansk (Светлополянск)	5
Verkhoshizhemsky (Верхошижемский)		district		33 208	33 608	Verkhoshizhemye (Верхошижемье)	8
Vyatskopolyansky (Вятскополянский)		district		33 210	33 610	Sosnovka (Сосновка) town*; Krasnaya Polyana (Красная Поляна)	11
Darovskoy (Даровской)		district		33 212	33 612	Darovskoy (Даровской)	5
Zuyevsky (Зуевский)		district		33 214	33 614	Zuyevka (Зуевка) town*	10
Kiknursky (Кикнурский)		district	okrug	33 216	33 616	Kiknur (Кикнур)	1
Kilmezsky (Кильмезский)		district		33 217	33 617	Kilmez (Кильмезь)	11
Kirovo-Chepetsky (Кирово-Чепецкий)		district		33 218	33 618		13
Kotelnichsky (Котельничский)		district		33 219	33 619		20
Kumyonsky (Кумёнский)		district		33 220	33 620	Kumyony (Кумёны); Nizhneivkino (Нижнеивкино)	7
Lebyazhsky (Лебяжский)		district		33 221	33 621	Lebyazhye (Лебяжье)	3
Luzsky (Лузский)		district		33 222	33 622	Luza (Луза) town*; Lalsk (Лальск)	1
Malmyzhsky (Малмыжский)		district		33 223	33 623	Malmyzh (Малмыж) town*	17
Murashinsky (Мурашинский)		district		33 224	33 624	Murashi (Мураши) town*	1
Nagorsky (Нагорский)		district		33 225	33 625	Nagorsk (Нагорск)	5
Nemsky (Немский)		district		33 226	33 626	Nema (Нема)	4
Nolinsky (Нолинский)		district		33 227	33 627	Nolinsk (Нолинск) town*; Arkul (Аркуль)	7
Omutninsky (Омутнинский)		district		33 228	33 628	Omutninsk (Омутнинск) town*; Peskovka (Песковка); Vostochny (Восточный)	6
Oparinsky (Опаринский)		district		33 229	33 629	Oparino (Опарино)	7
Orichevsky (Оричевский)		district		33 230	33 630	Lyovintsy (Левинцы); Mirny (Мирный); Orichi (Оричи); Strizhi (Стрижи)	14
Pizhansky (Пижанский)		district		33 231	33 631	Pizhanka (Пижанка)	5
Podosinovsky (Подосиновский)		district		33 232	33 632	Demyanovo (Демьяново); Pinyug (Пинюг); Podosinovets (Подосиновец)	3
Sanchursky (Санчурский)		district	okrug	33 233	33 633	Sanchursk (Санчурск)	6
Svechinsky (Свечинский)		district	okrug	33 234	33 634	Svecha (Свеча)	1
Slobodskoy (Слободской)		district		33 235	33 635	Vakhrushi (Вахруши)	12
Sovetsky (Советский)		district		33 236	33 636	Sovetsk (Советск) town*	10
Sunsky (Сунский)		district		33 237	33 637	Suna (Суна)	3
Tuzhinsky (Тужинский)		district		33 238	33 638	Tuzha (Тужа)	4
Uninsky (Унинский)		district		33 240	33 640	Uni (Уни)	8
Urzhumsky (Уржумский)		district		33 241	33 641	Urzhum (Уржум) town*	13
Falyonsky (Фалёнский)		district	okrug	33 243	33 643	Falyonki (Фалёнки)	6
Orlovsky (Орловский)		district		33 245	33 645	Orlov (Орлов) town*	1
Shabalinsky (Шабалинский)		district		33 247	33 647	Leninskoye (Ленинское)	4
Yuryansky (Юрьянский)		district		33 249	33 649	Murygino (Мурыгино); Yurya (Юрья)	7
Yaransky (Яранский)		district		33 250	33 650	Yaransk (Яранск) town*	9
