= Kirovo-Chepetsk constituency =

Legislative constituency in Russia

Kirov-Chepetsk single-member constituency
- Constituency of the Russian State Duma

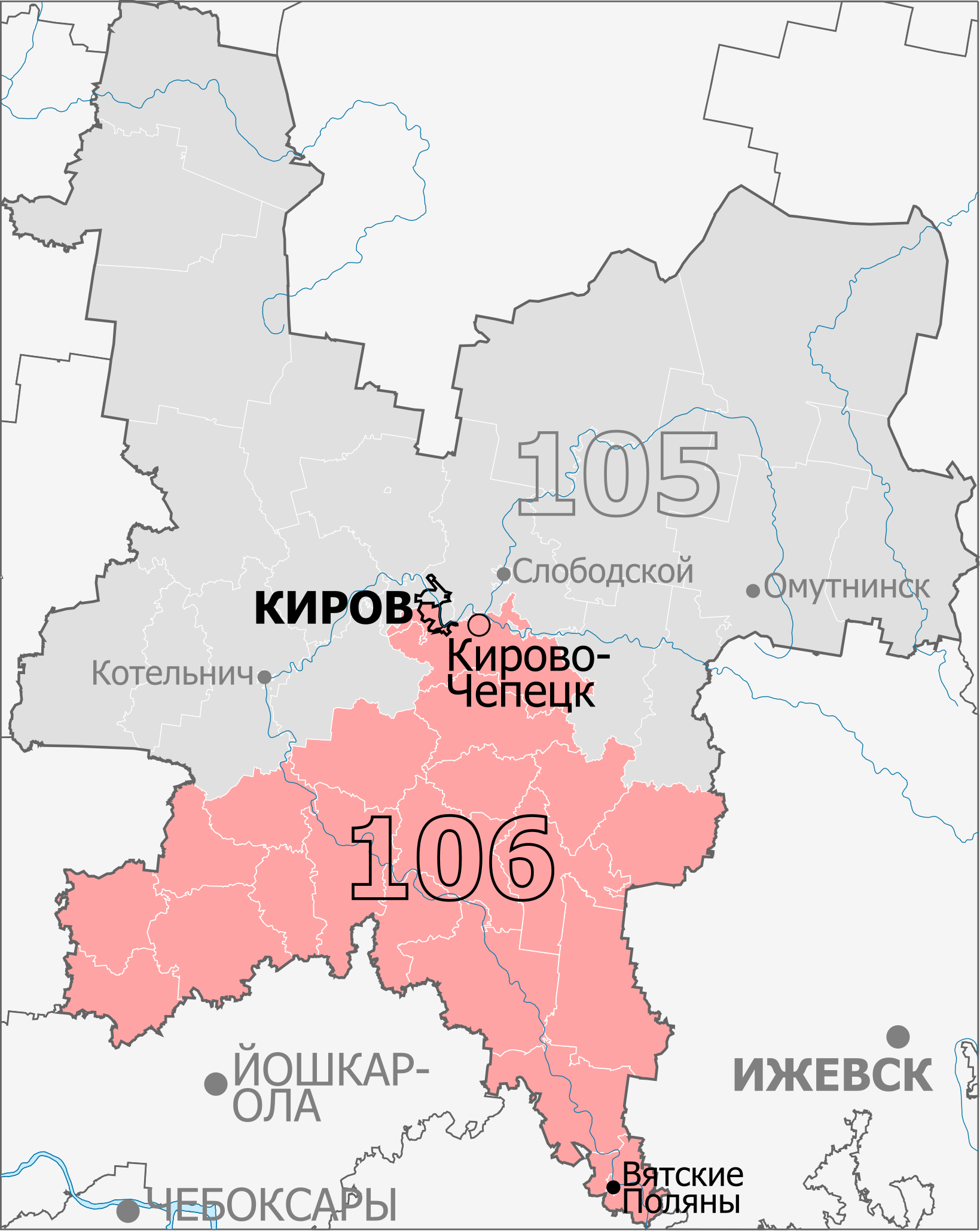
- Constituency boundaries since 2016
- Deputy: Andrey Berezin; United Russia
- Federal subject: Kirov Oblast
- Districts: Arbazhsky, Bogorodsky, Kiknursky, Kilmezsky, Kirov (Leninsky, Novovyatsky), Kirovo-Chepetsk, Kirovo-Chepetsky, Kumyonsky, Lebyazhsky, Malmyzhsky, Nemsky, Nolinsky, Pizhansky, Sanchursky, Sovetsky, Sunsky, Tuzhinsky, Uninsky, Urzhumsky, Verkhoshizhemsky, Vyatskiye Polyany, Vyatskopolyansky, Yaransky
- Voters: 509,184 (2026)

The Kirov-Chepetsk constituency (No.107 (Note: Sovetsk constituency No.94 in 1993-1995 and 2003-2007, Sovetsk constituency No.93 in 1995-2003, No.106 in 2016–2026)) is a Russian legislative constituency in Kirov Oblast. The constituency covers parts of Kirov and southern Kirov Oblast.

The constituency has been represented since 2026 by United Russia deputy Andrey Berezin, former Member of Kirov City Duma and businessman, who won the open seat after four-term United Russia incumbent Oleg Valenchuk ran for Legislative Assembly of Kirov Oblast.

== Boundaries ==
1993–1995 Sovetsk constituency: Arbazhsky District, Bogorodsky District, Darovskoy District, Falyonsky District, Kiknursky District, Kilmezsky District, Kirovo-Chepetsky District, Kotelnich, Kotelnichsky District, Kumyonsky District, Lebyazhsky District, Malmyzhsky District, Nemsky District, Nolinsky District, Orichevsky District, Orlovsky District, Pizhansky District, Sanchursky District, Shabalinsky District, Sovetsky District, Sunsky District, Svechinsky District, Tuzhinsky District, Uninsky District, Urzhumsky District, Verkhoshizhemsky District, Vyatskiye Polyany, Vyatskopolyansky District, Yaransky District, Zuyevsky District
The constituency covered central and southern Kirov Oblast, including the cities Kirovo-Chepetsk, Kotelnich and Vyatskiye Polyany.

1995–2003 Sovetsk constituency: Arbazhsky District, Bogorodsky District, Darovskoy District, Falyonsky District, Kiknursky District, Kilmezsky District, Kirovo-Chepetsky District, Kotelnich, Kotelnichsky District, Kumyonsky District, Lebyazhsky District, Malmyzhsky District, Nemsky District, Nolinsky District, Omutninsky District, Orichevsky District, Orlovsky District, Pizhansky District, Sanchursky District, Shabalinsky District, Sovetsky District, Sunsky District, Svechinsky District, Tuzhinsky District, Uninsky District, Urzhumsky District, Verkhoshizhemsky District, Vyatskiye Polyany, Vyatskopolyansky District, Yaransky District, Zuyevsky District
After 1995 redistricting the constituency was slightly changed, gaining Omutninsky District from Kirov constituency.

2003–2007 Sovetsk constituency: Arbazhsky District, Bogorodsky District, Darovskoy District, Falyonsky District, Kiknursky District, Kilmezsky District, Kirovo-Chepetsky District, Kotelnich, Kotelnichsky District, Kumyonsky District, Lebyazhsky District, Malmyzhsky District, Nemsky District, Nolinsky District, Orichevsky District, Orlovsky District, Pizhansky District, Sanchursky District, Shabalinsky District, Sovetsky District, Sunsky District, Svechinsky District, Tuzhinsky District, Uninsky District, Urzhumsky District, Verkhoshizhemsky District, Vyatskiye Polyany, Vyatskopolyansky District, Yaransky District, Zuyevsky District
The constituency was slightly altered after the 2003 redistricting, losing Omutninsky District to Kirov constituency.

2016–present: Arbazhsky District, Bogorodsky District, Kiknursky District, Kilmezsky District, Kirov (Leninsky, Novovyatsky), Kirovo-Chepetsk, Kirovo-Chepetsky District, Kumyonsky District, Lebyazhsky District, Malmyzhsky District, Nemsky District, Nolinsky District, Pizhansky District, Sanchursky District, Sovetsky District, Sunsky District, Tuzhinsky District, Uninsky District, Urzhumsky District, Verkhoshizhemsky District, Vyatskiye Polyany, Vyatskopolyansky District, Yaransky District
The constituency was re-created for the 2016 election under the name "Kirovo-Chepetsk constituency" and retained most of its territory, losing west-central and east-central Kirov Oblast, including the city Kotelnich, to Kirov constituency. This seat instead gained southern half of Kirov from Kirov constituency.

== Members elected ==
Election	Member	Party
1993	Yegor Agafonov	Independent
1995	Aleksey Melkov	Agrarian Party
1999	Nikolay Kiselyov	Independent
2003	Vladimir Klimov	United Russia
2007	Proportional representation - no election by constituency	
2011	Proportional representation - no election by constituency	
2016	Oleg Valenchuk	United Russia
2021	Oleg Valenchuk	United Russia
2026	Andrey Berezin	United Russia

== Election results ==
=== 1993 ===
Summary of the 12 December 1993 Russian legislative election in the Sovetsk constituency
Candidate	Party	Votes	%
Yegor Agafonov	Independent	108,628	31.95%
Pyotr Polyantsev	Independent	–	22.90%
Boris Noskov	Democratic Party	–	–
Valery Ostretsov	Party of Russian Unity and Accord	–	–
Yury Samsonov	Independent	–	–
Total		340,000	100%

=== 1995 ===
Summary of the 17 December 1995 Russian legislative election in the Sovetsk constituency
Candidate	Party	Votes	%
Aleksey Melkov	Agrarian Party	125,022	29.75%
Valery Lekomtsev	Independent	72,491	17.25%
Tamara Urvantseva	Communists and Working Russia - for the Soviet Union	67,247	16.00%
Marat Salikhov	Liberal Democratic Party	48,797	11.61%
Samvel Kochoi	Congress of Russian Communities	27,994	6.66%
Vyacheslav Torsunov	Independent	20,599	4.90%
Minegayaz Faskhutdinov	Nur	7,499	1.78%
against all		43,883	10.44%
Total		420,225	100%

=== 1999 ===
Summary of the 19 December 1999 Russian legislative election in the Sovetsk constituency
Candidate	Party	Votes	%
Nikolay Kiselyov	Independent	130,332	33.93%
Vladimir Vlasov	Andrey Nikolayev and Svyatoslav Fyodorov Bloc	39,149	10.19%
Valentin Pervakov	Independent	36,236	9.43%
Valentina Zykina	Our Home – Russia	33,572	8.74%
Sergey Yakshin	Peace, Labour, May	31,971	8.32%
Olga Chezhegova	Fatherland – All Russia	23,424	6.10%
Leonid Simonov	Yabloko	21,437	5.58%
Sergey Sharenkov	Independent	7,877	2.05%
Aleksey Pogrebnoy	Kedr	6,322	1.65%
Boris Basmanov	Spiritual Heritage	2,864	0.75%
against all		44,741	11.65%
Total		383,540	100%

=== 2003 ===
Results by district: Vladimir Klimov: 20–30% 30–40% 40–50%; Nikolay Kiselyov: 20–30% 30–40% 40–50%

Summary of the 7 December 2003 Russian legislative election in the Sovetsk constituency
Candidate	Party	Votes	%
Vladimir Klimov	United Russia	107,824	33.81%
Nikolay Kiselyov (incumbent)	Communist Party	90,527	28.38%
Andrey Vavilov	Union of Right Forces	22,650	7.10%
Vasily Vershinin	Agrarian Party	22,562	7.07%
Vladimir Ponomarev	Liberal Democratic Party	11,734	3.68%
Dmitry Shvetsov	Yabloko	11,550	3.62%
against all		39,204	12.29%
Total		319,127	100%

=== 2016 ===
Summary of the 18 September 2016 Russian legislative election in the Kirovo-Chepetsk constituency
Candidate	Party	Votes	%
Oleg Valenchuk	United Russia	95,499	40.44%
Sergey Doronin	A Just Russia	45,069	19.08%
Sergey Mamayev	Communist Party	30,529	12.93%
Vladimir Kostin	Liberal Democratic Party	28,670	12.14%
Olga Shakleina	The Greens	8,459	3.58%
Oleg Kassin	Party of Growth	4,880	2.07%
Vladimir Porchesku	Communists of Russia	4,666	1.98%
Artur Abashev	Yabloko	4,574	1.94%
Fyodor Luginin	Rodina	3,116	1.32%
Total		236,165	100%

=== 2021 ===
Summary of the 17-19 September 2021 Russian legislative election in the Kirovo-Chepetsk constituency
Candidate	Party	Votes	%
Oleg Valenchuk (incumbent)	United Russia	73,852	31.20%
Nadezhda Surayeva	A Just Russia — For Truth	57,673	24.36%
Sergey Mamayev	Communist Party	36,608	15.46%
Vladimir Kostin	Liberal Democratic Party	17,832	7.53%
Anastasia Skurikhina	New People	17,679	7.47%
Aleksandr Markov	Party of Pensioners	11,098	4.69%
Sergey Sadovnikov	Communists of Russia	7,639	3.23%
Olga Sykchina	Rodina	3,849	1.63%
Total		236,736	100%

=== 2026 ===
Summary of the 18-20 September 2026 Russian legislative election in the Kirovo-Chepetsk constituency
Candidate	Party	Votes	%
Andrey Berezin	United Russia	85,760	33.68%
Anna Alminova	New People	47,468	18.64%
Aleksandr Nikulin	A Just Russia	32,005	12.57%
Mikhail Kremlyov	Communist Party	30,899	12.13%
Olga Tyrykina	Liberal Democratic Party	24,286	9.54%
Yekaterina Suslova	Party of Pensioners	13,877	5.45%
Vladimir Badmayev	Communists of Russia	10,357	4.07%
Total		254,637	100%
