= Kholuy =

Kholuy (Russian: Холуй) is the name of several rural localities (selos and villages) in Russia:

- Kholuy, Ivanovo Oblast, a selo in Yuzhsky District of Ivanovo Oblast
- Kholuy, Kirov Oblast, a village under the administrative jurisdiction of the urban-type settlement of Nizhneivkino in Kumyonsky District of Kirov Oblast
- Kholuy, Vologda Oblast, a village in Vozhegodsky Selsoviet of Vozhegodsky District of Vologda Oblast
