= Podosinovets =

One of several places in Russia

Podosinovets (Russian: Подоси́новец) is the name of several inhabited localities in Russia.

Urban localities

- Podosinovets, Kirov Oblast, an urban-type settlement in Podosinovsky District of Kirov Oblast

Rural localities

- Podosinovets, Vologda Oblast, a settlement in Osinovsky Selsoviet of Nikolsky District of Vologda Oblast
