= Peskovka =

Peskovka (Russian: Песковка) is the name of several inhabited localities in Russia.

Urban localities

- Peskovka, Kirov Oblast, an urban-type settlement in Omutninsky District of Kirov Oblast

Rural localities

- Peskovka, Volgograd Oblast, a selo in Medveditsky Selsoviet of Zhirnovsky District of Volgograd Oblast
