= Butino =

Butino (Russian: Бутино) is the name of several rural localities in Russia.

== Modern localities ==
- Butino, Kirov Oblast, a village in Loynsky Rural Okrug of Verkhnekamsky District in Kirov Oblast; 59°47′N 52°46′E
- Butino, Tver Oblast, a village in Kozlovskoye Rural Settlement of Spirovsky District in Tver Oblast

== Abolished localities ==
- Butino, Kostroma Oblast, a village in Andreyevsky Selsoviet of Susaninsky District of Kostroma Oblast; abolished on November 5, 2004
