= Omutninsky =

Omutninsky (masculine), Omutninskaya (feminine), or Omutninskoye (neuter) may refer to:

- Omutninsky District, a district of Kirov Oblast, Russia
- Omutninskoye Urban Settlement, a municipal formation which the Town of Omutninsk in Omutninsky District of Kirov Oblast, Russia is incorporated as
- Omutninsky (rural locality), a rural locality (a settlement) in Omutninsky District of Kirov Oblast, Russia
