= Demyanovo =

Demyanovo Демьяново
- Urban-type settlement
- Interactive map of Demyanovo
- Location of Demyanovo Demyanovo (Kirov Oblast)
- Coordinates: 60.3541°N 47.0901°E
- Country: Russia
- Federal subject: Kirov Oblast
- Administrative district: Podosinovsky District
- Founded: 1954
- Elevation: 129 m (423 ft)

Population (2010 Census)
  - Total: 5,558
  - Estimate (2025): 4,138 (−25.5%)
- Time zone: UTC+3 (MSK)
- Postal code: 613911
- OKTMO ID: 33632154051

Demyanovo (Russian: Демьяново) is an urban locality (an urban-type settlement) in Podosinovsky District of Kirov Oblast, Russia. Population: 5,558 (2010 census); 6,423 (2002 census); 7,023 (1989 Soviet census).
