= Chumbylat =

Chumbylat (Mari: Чумбылат, Кугу Курык Кугыза) was a 12th-century ruler of the northern Mari city and country of Kokshar, nowadays known as Kotel'nich, in Russia. He came from a noble dynasty of rulers of Kokshar and was related to the previous ruler, Kugyrak. Chumbylat united the Mari people and brought them to the land they live in now. He ordered the building of many fortresses and his country reached from Kotel'nich to Nizhny Novgorod. The Mari people considered Chumbylat their king. During his reign, many religious traditions developed that stayed unchanged for centuries. Before going to battle, Chumbylat and his companions prayed in the sacred groves accompanied by a zither ensemble. After that they sang inspirational songs and went into battle.

In 1181 Kotel'nich was captured for the first time by the Novgorod uškuiniks. Chumbylat built a new capital Kukarka and attacked Kotel'nich and Hlynov, destroying them completely.

According to Mari oral tradition, Chumbylat gathered armies of tens of thousands of warriors to defend his land, people and religion.

Chumbylat lived a long life and ordered him to be buried by his fortress in Kukarka on Chumbylat's mountain.

== Chumbylat's mountain ==
After Chumbylat's death, the Maris began revering him by his grave. Regular prayers were organised even after the Russian conquest of Maris. However, this was not to the liking of the Russian church and in 1831 the Vjatka police chief ordered the mountain to be blown up. When Maris continued praying on Chumbylat's mountain, armed guards were sent to guard the mountain. Then the Maris organised their prayers on a neighbouring mountain a few kilometres away, to which the Maris in the region were gulaged and Russians were brought in instead.

In 1993 the big prayers on Chumbylat's mountain were brought back. Since then, even three years, Maris from all over Russia visit Chumbylat's grave.
