= Oleg Valenchuk =

Russian politician

- Олег Валенчук
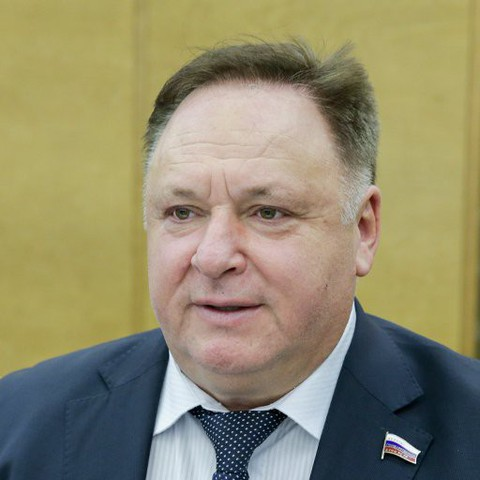

Member of the State Duma for Kirov Oblast
- Incumbent
- Assumed office 5 October 2016
- Preceded by: constituency re-established
- Constituency: Kirovo-Chepetsk (No. 106)

Member of the State Duma (Party List Seat)
- In office 24 December 2007 – 5 October 2016

Personal details
- Born: 14 September 1960 (age 66) Kirov, Russian SFSR, USSR
- Party: United Russia (2001-2003, from 2007); LDPR (2003-2007)
- Spouse: Tatiana Petrovna Valenchuk
- Parent: 2
- Education: Kirov State Pedagogical Institute

Oleg Dorianovich Valenchuk (Russian: Олег Дорианович Валенчук; born 14 September 1960, Kirov, Kirov Oblast) is a Russian political figure and a deputy of the 5th, 6th, 7th, and 8th State Dumas.

From 1992 to 1997, Valenchuk served as deputy chairman of the Kirov branch of the Bureau of International Youth Tourism "Sputnik". In 2003–2007, he was the head of the organization. In 1997 he started working as an advisor to politician Mikhail Mikeev who at that time was the Chairman of the Legislative Assembly of the Kirov Oblast. In 2001, Valenchuk became the First Deputy Chairman of the Political Council of the Kirov Oblast branch of the United Russia. In 2003, he was expelled from the party for violating the party regulations as he illegally used party symbols in his election campaign while the party did not officially support him as a candidate. In 2007, he was reinstated in the party. In March 2006, he was elected deputy of the Legislative Assembly of the Kirov Oblast of the 4th convocation. Valenchuk ran with the Liberal Democratic Party of Russia. In 2007, 2011, 2016, and 2021, he was elected deputy of the 5th, 6th, 7th, and 8th State Dumas, respectively.

== Sanctions ==
He was sanctioned by the UK government in 2022 in relation to the Russo-Ukrainian War.
