= Lyovintsy =

Lyovintsy Лёвинцы
- Urban-type settlement
- Interactive map of Lyovintsy
- Location of Lyovintsy Lyovintsy (Kirov Oblast)
- Coordinates: 58.4213°N 49.2493°E
- Country: Russia
- Federal subject: Kirov Oblast
- Administrative district: Orichevsky District

Population (2010 Census)
  - Total: 2,145
  - Estimate (2025): 1,755 (−18.2%)
- Time zone: UTC+3 (MSK)
- Postal code: 612079
- OKTMO ID: 33630153051

Lyovintsy (Russian: Лёвинцы) is an urban locality (an urban-type settlement) in Orichevsky District of Kirov Oblast, Russia. Population: 2,145 (2010 census);
