= Strizhi, Orichevsky District, Kirov Oblast =

Strizhi Стрижи
- Urban-type settlement
- Interactive map of Strizhi
- Location of Strizhi Strizhi (Kirov Oblast)
- Coordinates: 58.4628°N 49.2636°E
- Country: Russia
- Federal subject: Kirov Oblast
- Administrative district: Orichevsky District

Population (2010 Census)
  - Total: 3,730
  - Estimate (2025): 3,110 (−16.6%)
- Time zone: UTC+3 (MSK)
- Postal code: 612090
- OKTMO ID: 33630157051

Strizhi (Russian: Стрижи) is an urban locality (an urban-type settlement) in Orichevsky District of Kirov Oblast, Russia. Population: 3,730 (2010 census); 4,003 (2002 census); 4,715 (1989 Soviet census).
