= Pinyug =

Pinyug Пинюг
- Urban-type settlement
- Interactive map of Pinyug
- Location of Pinyug Pinyug (Kirov Oblast)
- Coordinates: 60.2509°N 47.7861°E
- Country: Russia
- Federal subject: Kirov Oblast
- Administrative district: Podosinovsky District
- Founded: 1895

Population (2010 Census)
  - Total: 2,344
  - Estimate (2025): 1,285 (−45.2%)
- Time zone: UTC+3 (MSK)
- Postal code: 613920
- OKTMO ID: 33632157051

Pinyug (Russian: Пинюг) is an urban locality (an urban-type settlement) in Podosinovsky District of Kirov Oblast, Russia. Population: 2,344 (2010 census); 3,006 (2002 census); 4,020 (1989 Soviet census).
