= Svetlopolyansk =

Svetlopolyansk Светлополянск
- Urban-type settlement
- Interactive map of Svetlopolyansk
- Location of Svetlopolyansk Svetlopolyansk (Kirov Oblast)
- Coordinates: 59.4211°N 52.3653°E
- Country: Russia
- Federal subject: Kirov Oblast
- Administrative district: Verkhnekamsky District
- Founded: 1964

Population (2010 Census)
  - Total: 2,923
  - Estimate (2025): 2,228 (−23.8%)
- Time zone: UTC+3 (MSK)
- Postal code: 612814
- OKTMO ID: 33607162051

Svetlopolyansk (Russian: Светлополянск) is an urban locality (an urban-type settlement) in Verkhnekamsky District of Kirov Oblast, Russia. Population: 2,923 (2010 census); 3,275 (2002 census); 3,967 (1989 Soviet census).
