= Vostochny, Kirov Oblast =

Vostochny Восточный
- Urban-type settlement
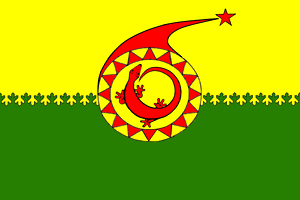
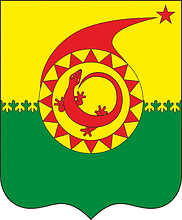
- Flag Coat of arms
- Interactive map of Vostochny
- Location of Vostochny Vostochny (Kirov Oblast)
- Coordinates: 58.7876°N 52.2464°E
- Country: Russia
- Federal subject: Kirov Oblast
- Administrative district: Omutninsky District
- Founded: 1968
- Urban-type settlement status since: 1973
- Elevation: 237 m (778 ft)

Population (2010 Census)
  - Total: 7,237
  - Estimate (2025): 5,601 (−22.6%)
- Time zone: UTC+3 (MSK)
- Postal code: 612711
- Dialing code: +7 83352
- OKTMO ID: 33628155051

Vostochny (Russian: Восточный) is an urban locality (an urban-type settlement) in Omutninsky District of Kirov Oblast, Russia. Population: 7,237 (2010 census); 7,861 (2002 census); 8,226 (1989 Soviet census).

== History ==
In accordance with the joint resolution of the Central Committee of the Communist Party of the Soviet Union and the Council of Ministers of the Soviet Union dated August 2, 1958, the Executive Committee of the Kirov Oblast Council of Workers' Deputies decided on December 12, 1958, to build a chemical plant and allocated an uninhabited forest plot 15 kilometers from Omutninsk. Between 1961 and 1963, the first 15 prefabricated semi-detached houses were built near the stadium along the temporary Stroiteley Street. Between 1977 and 1979, all the prefabricated houses were demolished. The first permanent structure in the village was a boiler house built in 1963, which was converted into a gym in 1973, and the first brick houses were at 1, 3, and 3A Azina Street. The first well-appointed four-story residential building was commissioned in 1967 (4 Snezhnaya Street), marking the beginning of Snezhnaya Street.

On December 27, 1968, the state commission signed the commissioning act for the first phase of the plant, a biotechnical facility designed to produce microbiologically synthesized products. About a month later, the first batches of product were produced under industrial conditions. In June 1969, the first industrial batch of hygromycin, used in livestock farming as an anthelmintic, was produced. In July, the plant became one of the operating enterprises with a firm production plan. In 1974, production at the plant became profitable.

The Vostochny settlement was built according to a master plan. Beginning in 1970, plans for the development of capital investments in the construction of housing and social and cultural facilities and their commissioning were fulfilled annually.

The village boasts 38 multi-story brick and panel buildings, two dormitories, two schools, three kindergartens, a nursing home, a hospital (MSCh-131), a library, a hotel, a telephone exchange, a service center, a sports complex (former boiler house), and a bath and laundry facility. Fire Station No. 68, a water treatment plant, a wastewater treatment plant, and a gas boiler house operate in the industrial zone. The hotel and one kindergarten are currently closed. The Assumption Church was built between 1992 and 1999.

== Economy ==
The city-forming biochemical plant (formerly the Omutninsk Chemical Plant during the Soviet era, and later, after privatization, Vostok LLC), a large industrial enterprise, became unprofitable and was declared bankrupt in 2008. In 2011, the plant was acquired by Kirovsky BioKhimZavod LLC. Mothballing was completed and production was restarted.

The second city-forming enterprise is the Omutninsk Scientific Experimental Industrial Base (ONOPB), founded on April 1, 1974, as part of the Scientific and Production Association Biopreparat to develop microbiological production technologies and test equipment used in technical microbiology. The plant participated in the Soviet biological weapons program. It currently produces anticancer drugs and other fine microbiological synthesis products, organizes technological processes for the production of anticancer drug substances, and prepares for the release of finished pharmaceuticals in ampoules and vials.

The settlement houses a prison, the Federal Penitentiary Institution Correctional Colony No. 6 of the Kirov Oblast Directorate of the Federal Penitentiary Service, which operates a sewing workshop, a sawmill, a carpentry shop, a bakery, and a subsidiary farm. Branch No. 1 of Federal Penitentiary Service Vocational School No. 339 of the Federal Penitentiary Service of Russia operates within the colony.
