= Sosnovka, Vyatskopolyansky District, Kirov Oblast =

Town in Kirov Oblast, Russia

Sosnovka Сосновка
- Town
- Interactive map of Sosnovka
- Location of Sosnovka Sosnovka (Kirov Oblast)
- Coordinates: 56°15′N 51°18′E
- Country: Russia
- Federal subject: Kirov Oblast
- Administrative district: Vyatskopolyansky District
- TownSelsoviet: Sosnovka
- First mentioned: 1699
- Town status since: 1962
- Elevation: 80 m (260 ft)

Population (2010 Census)
  - Total: 11,960
  - Estimate (2021): 8,428 (−29.5%)

Administrative status
  - Capital of: Town of Sosnovka

Municipal status
  - Municipal district: Vyatskopolyansky Municipal District
  - Urban settlement: Sosnovskoye Urban Settlement
  - Capital of: Sosnovskoye Urban Settlement
- Time zone: UTC+3 (MSK)
- Postal codes: 612990, 612993, 612994
- OKTMO ID: 33610104001

Sosnovka (Russian: Сосно́вка) is a town in Vyatskopolyansky District of Kirov Oblast, Russia, located on the left bank of the Vyatka River, 362 kilometers (225 mi) south of Kirov, the administrative center of the oblast. Population: 11,960 (2010 census); 12,840 (2002 census); 15,179 (1989 Soviet census).

== History ==
It was first mentioned in 1699. At the beginning of the 20th century, Sosnovka developed as an industrial village with a sawmill and later with a cable rope factory. In 1938, the village was granted work settlement status, and in 1962, town status.

== Administrative and municipal status ==
Within the framework of administrative divisions, it is incorporated within Vyatskopolyansky District as the Town of Sosnovka. As a municipal division, the Town of Sosnovka is incorporated within Vyatskopolyansky Municipal District as Sosnovskoye Urban Settlement.
