= Krasnaya Polyana, Vyatskopolyansky District, Kirov Oblast =

Krasnaya Polyana Красная Поляна
- Urban-type settlement
- Interactive map of Krasnaya Polyana
- Location of Krasnaya Polyana Krasnaya Polyana (Kirov Oblast)
- Coordinates: 56.2367°N 51.1726°E
- Country: Russia
- Federal subject: Kirov Oblast
- Administrative district: Vyatskopolyansky District

Population (2010 Census)
  - Total: 6,779
  - Estimate (2025): 4,985 (−26.5%)
- Time zone: UTC+3 (MSK)
- Postal code: 612950
- OKTMO ID: 33610154051

Krasnaya Polyana (Russian: Красная Поляна) is an urban locality (an urban-type settlement) in Vyatskopolyansky District of Kirov Oblast, Russia. Population: 6,779 (2010 census); 8,073 (2002 census); 8,532 (1989 Soviet census).
