= Nolinsk =

Town in Kirov Oblast, Russia

Nolinsk Нолинск
- Town
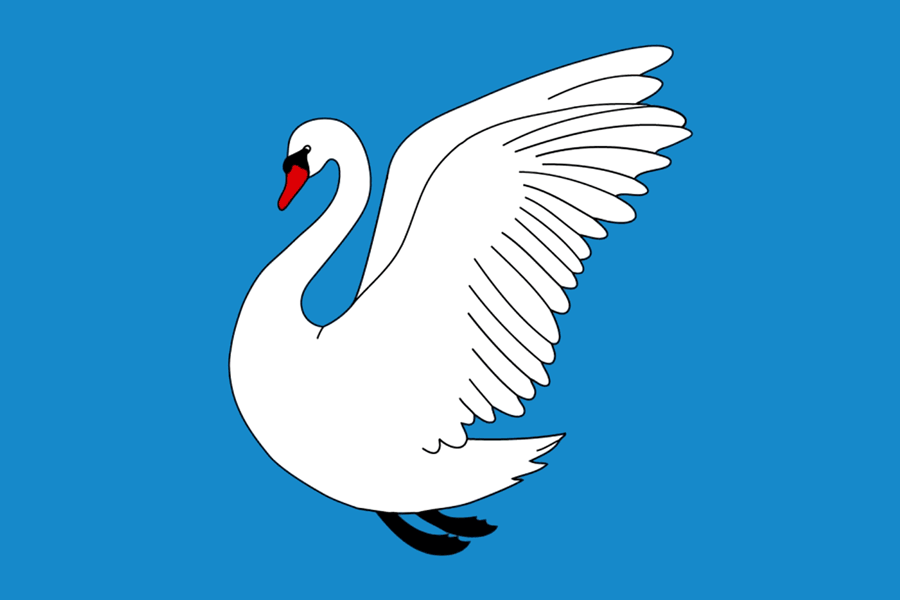
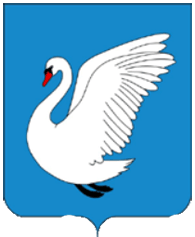
- Flag Coat of arms
- Interactive map of Nolinsk
- Location of Nolinsk Nolinsk (Kirov Oblast)
- Coordinates: 57°34′N 49°56′E
- Country: Russia
- Federal subject: Kirov Oblast
- Administrative district: Nolinsky District
- TownSelsoviet: Nolinsk
- Founded: 1668
- Town status since: 1780
- Elevation: 110 m (360 ft)

Population (2010 Census)
  - Total: 9,554
  - Estimate (2021): 8,262 (−13.5%)

Administrative status
  - Capital of: Nolinsky District, Town of Nolinsk

Municipal status
  - Municipal district: Nolinsky Municipal District
  - Urban settlement: Nolinskoye Urban Settlement
  - Capital of: Nolinsky Municipal District, Nolinskoye Urban Settlement
- Time zone: UTC+3 (MSK)
- Postal codes: 613440, 613441, 613459
- OKTMO ID: 33627101001

Nolinsk (Russian: Ноли́нск) is a town and the administrative center of Nolinsky District in Kirov Oblast, Russia, located on the right bank of the Voya River (Vyatka's tributary), 143 kilometers (89 mi) south of Kirov, the administrative center of the oblast. Population: 9,554 (2010 census); 10,463 (2002 census); 10,902 (1989 Soviet census).

== History ==
It was founded in 1668 as Nikolsky pogost (Нико́льский пого́ст), which was later also called the village of Noli (Ноли). It was granted town status in 1780. In 1940–1957, it was called Molotovsk (Мо́лотовск) after Soviet politician and diplomat Vyacheslav Molotov, who was born in the nearby town of Sovetsk.

== Administrative and municipal status ==
Within the framework of administrative divisions, Nolinsk serves as the administrative center of Nolinsky District. As an administrative division, it is incorporated within Nolinsky District as the Town of Nolinsk. As a municipal division, the Town of Nolinsk is incorporated within Nolinsky Municipal District as Nolinskoye Urban Settlement.
