= Arkul =

Arkul Аркуль
- Work settlement
- Interactive map of Arkul
- Location of Arkul Arkul (Kirov Oblast)
- Coordinates: 57°16′48″N 50°02′31″E
- Country: Russia
- Federal subject: Kirov Oblast
- Administrative district: Nolinsky District
- Founded: 1912
- Elevation: 75 m (246 ft)

Population (2010 Census)
  - Total: 2,053
  - Estimate (2025): 1,243 (−39.5%)

Municipal status
  - Municipal district: Nolinsky Municipal District
  - Urban settlement: Arkulskoye Urban Settlement
  - Capital of: Arkulskoye Urban Settlement
- Time zone: UTC+3 (MSK)
- Postal code: 613445
- OKTMO ID: 33627152051

Arkul (Russian: Аркуль) is an urban locality (urban-type settlement) in Nolinsky District of Kirov Oblast, Russia. Population: 2,053 (2010 census); 2,616 (2002 census); 3,163 (1989 Soviet census).
