= Mirny, Orichevsky District, Kirov Oblast =

Mirny Мирный
- Urban-type settlement
- Interactive map of Mirny
- Location of Mirny Mirny (Kirov Oblast)
- Coordinates: 58.3045°N 48.6414°E
- Country: Russia
- Federal subject: Kirov Oblast
- Administrative district: Orichevsky District

Population (2010 Census)
  - Total: 3,912
  - Estimate (2025): 3,000 (−23.3%)
- Time zone: UTC+3 (MSK)
- Postal code: 612085
- OKTMO ID: 33630154051

Mirny (Russian: Мирный) is an urban locality (an urban-type settlement) in Orichevsky District of Kirov Oblast, Russia. Population: 3,912 (2010 census); 3,618 (2002 census); 3,929 (1989 Soviet census).
