= Rudnichny, Kirov Oblast =

Rudnichny Рудничный
- Urban-type settlement
- Interactive map of Rudnichny
- Location of Rudnichny Rudnichny (Kirov Oblast)
- Coordinates: 59.6146°N 52.4743°E
- Country: Russia
- Federal subject: Kirov Oblast
- Administrative district: Verkhnekamsky District
- Founded: 1915

Population (2010 Census)
  - Total: 5,084
  - Estimate (2025): 2,540 (−50%)
- Time zone: UTC+3 (MSK)
- Postal code: 612830
- OKTMO ID: 33607160051

Rudnichny (Russian: Рудничный) is an urban locality (an urban-type settlement) in Verkhnekamsky District of Kirov Oblast, Russia. Population: 5,084 (2010 census); 5,729 (2002 census); 7,746 (1989 Soviet census).
