= Lesnoy, Kirov Oblast =

Lesnoy Лесной
- Urban-type settlement
- Interactive map of Lesnoy
- Location of Lesnoy Lesnoy (Kirov Oblast)
- Coordinates: 59.7819°N 52.1310°E
- Country: Russia
- Federal subject: Kirov Oblast
- Administrative district: Verkhnekamsky District

Population (2010 Census)
  - Total: 5,413
  - Estimate (2025): 3,247 (−40%)
- Time zone: UTC+3 (MSK)
- Postal code: 612815
- OKTMO ID: 33607154051

Lesnoy (Russian: Лесной) is an urban locality (an urban-type settlement) in Verkhnekamsky District of Kirov Oblast, Russia. Population: 5,413 (2010 census); 7,132 (2002 census); 7,495 (1989 Soviet census).
