= Kumyony =

Kumyony Кумёны
- Urban-type settlement
- Interactive map of Kumyony
- Location of Kumyony Kumyony (Kirov Oblast)
- Coordinates: 58.1088°N 49.9205°E
- Country: Russia
- Federal subject: Kirov Oblast
- Administrative district: Kumyonsky District
- Founded: 1678

Population (2010 Census)
  - Total: 4,827
  - Estimate (2025): 4,076 (−15.6%)
- Time zone: UTC+3 (MSK)
- Postal code: 613400
- OKTMO ID: 33620151051

Kumyony (Russian: Кумёны) is an urban locality (an urban-type settlement) in Kumyonsky District of Kirov Oblast, Russia. Population: 4,827 (2010 census); 5,249 (2002 census); 5,588 (1989 Soviet census).
