= Podosinovets, Vologda Oblast =

Podosinovets Подосиновец
- Settlement
- Location within Vologda Oblast Location within Russia
- Coordinates: 59°29′N 45°25′E
- Country: Russia
- Region: Vologda Oblast
- District: Nikolsky District
- Time zone: UTC+3:00

Podosinovets (Russian: Подосиновец) is a rural locality (a settlement) in Krasnopolyanskoye Rural Settlement, Nikolsky District, Vologda Oblast, Russia. The population was 15 as of 2010.

== Geography ==
Podosinovets is located 8 km southwest of Nikolsk (the district's administrative centre) by road. Svetly Klyuch is the nearest rural locality.
