= Vyatskiye Polyany =

Town in Kirov Oblast, Russia

Vyatskiye Polyany Вятские Поляны
- Town
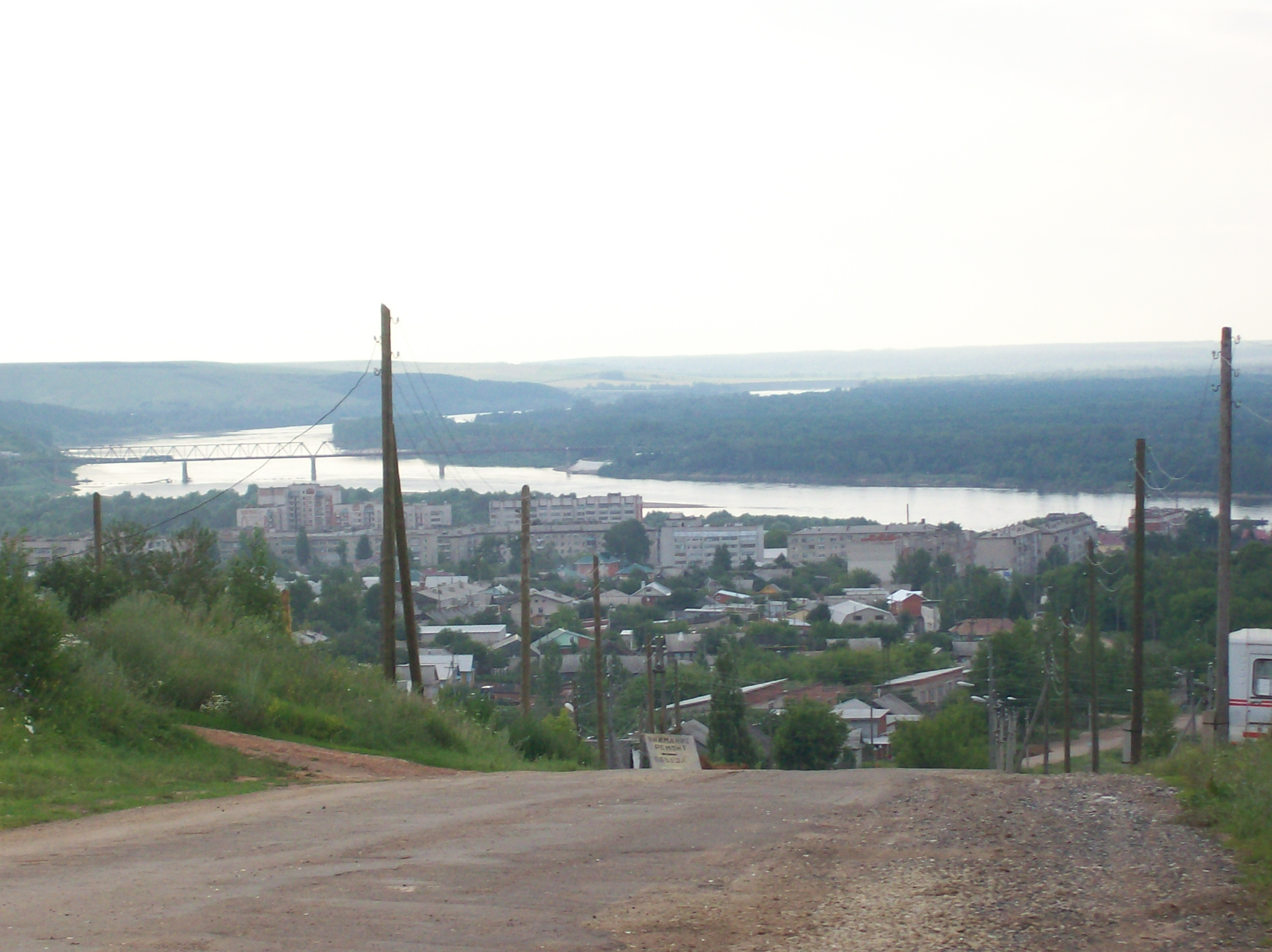
- View of Vyatskiye Polyany

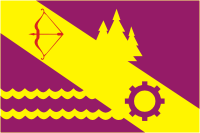
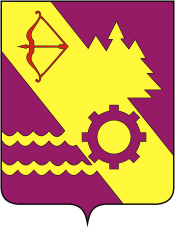
- Flag Coat of arms
- Interactive map of Vyatskiye Polyany
- Location of Vyatskiye Polyany Vyatskiye Polyany (Kirov Oblast)
- Coordinates: 56°13′26″N 51°03′48″E
- Country: Russia
- Federal subject: Kirov Oblast
- Known since: 1596
- Town status since: 1942
- Elevation: 100 m (330 ft)

Population (2010 Census)
  - Total: 35,162
  - Estimate (2021): 29,742 (−15.4%)

Administrative status
  - Subordinated to: Town of Vyatskiye Polyany
  - Capital of: Vyatskopolyansky District, Town of Vyatskiye Polyany

Municipal status
  - Urban okrug: Vyatskiye Polyany Urban Okrug
  - Capital of: Vyatskiye Polyany Urban Okrug, Vyatskopolyansky Municipal District
- Time zone: UTC+3 (MSK)
- Postal code: 612960–612966
- OKTMO ID: 33704000001
- Website: www.admvpol.ru

Vyatskiye Polyany (Russian: Вя́тские Поля́ны) is a town in Kirov Oblast, Russia, located on the right bank of the Vyatka River, 350 kilometers (220 mi) southeast of Kirov. Population: 29,742 (2021 Estimate); 35,162 (2010 census); 40,282 (2002 census); 44,513 (1989 Soviet census).

== History ==
It has been known since 1596. A railway passed through it in 1915. Urban-type settlement status was granted to it in 1938 and town status—in 1942.

== Administrative and municipal status ==
Within the framework of administrative divisions, Vyatskiye Polyany serves as the administrative center of Vyatskopolyansky District, even though it is not a part of it. As an administrative division, it is incorporated separately as the Town of Vyatskiye Polyany—an administrative unit with the status equal to that of the districts. As a municipal division, the Town of Vyatskiye Polyany is incorporated as Vyatskiye Polyany Urban Okrug.

== Economy ==
Vyatskiye Polyany is a town with economy centered on a single enterprise, the Molot factory. The factory was active in machine building and was oriented to the military industry. In 2009, it became unprofitable, and in 2010, it stopped. The salaries were not paid for months. The authorities initiated the programs of diversification of the industry and of reorientation of the factory.
