= Nizhneivkino =

Nizhneivkino Нижнеивкино
- Urban-type settlement
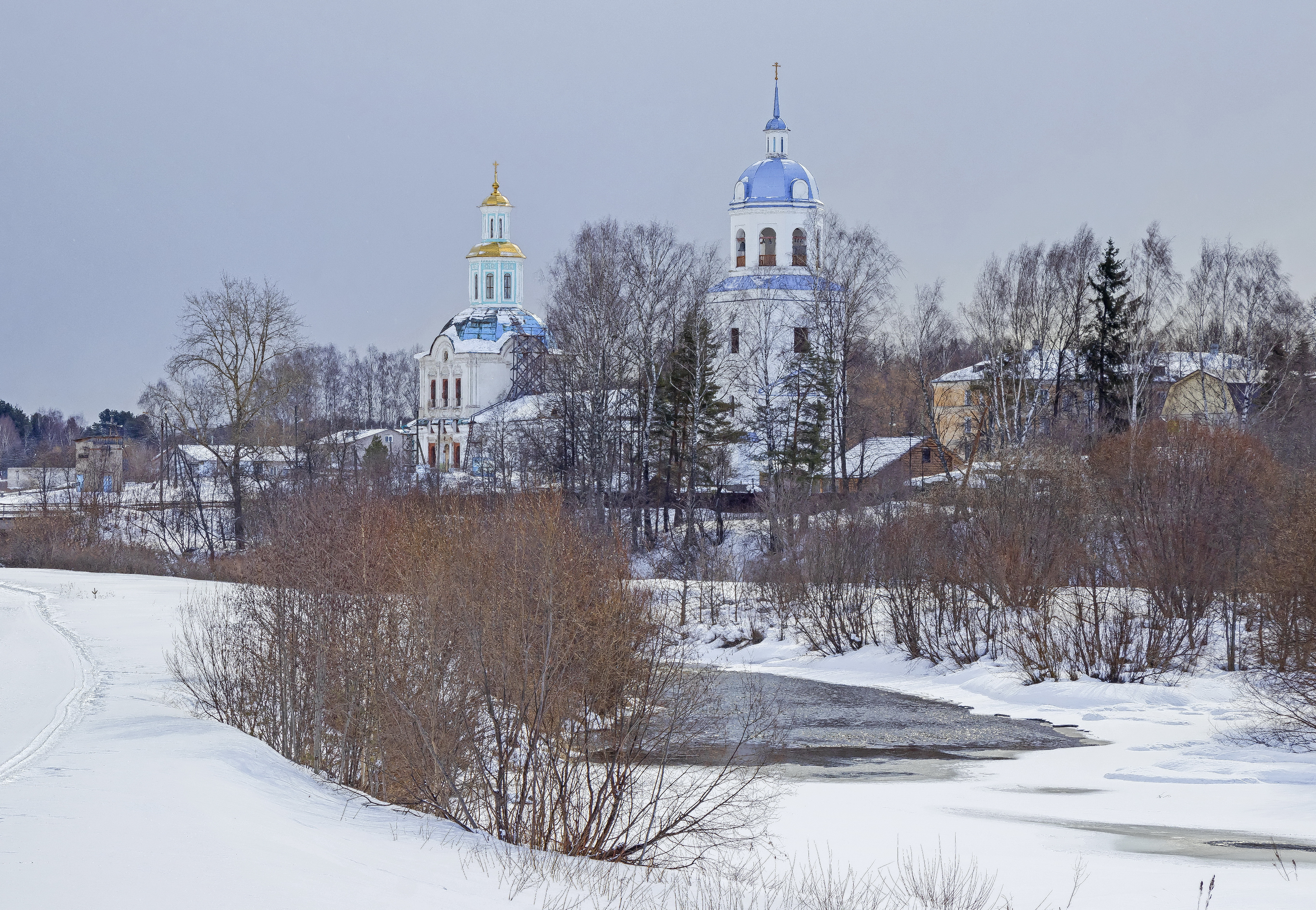
- Interactive map of Nizhneivkino
- Location of Nizhneivkino Nizhneivkino (Kirov Oblast)
- Coordinates: 58.1930°N 49.5191°E
- Country: Russia
- Federal subject: Kirov Oblast
- Administrative district: Kumyonsky District

Population (2010 Census)
  - Total: 2,079
  - Estimate (2025): 1,575 (−24.2%)
- Time zone: UTC+3 (MSK)
- Postal code: 610901
- OKTMO ID: 33620154051

Nizhneivkino (Russian: Нижнеивкино) is an urban locality (an urban-type settlement) in Kumyonsky District of Kirov Oblast, Russia. Population: 2,079 (2010 census); 2,304 (2002 census); 3,222 (1989 Soviet census).
