= Kirovo-Chepetsky District =

Kirovo-Chepetsky District Кирово-Чепецкий район (Russian)
- District
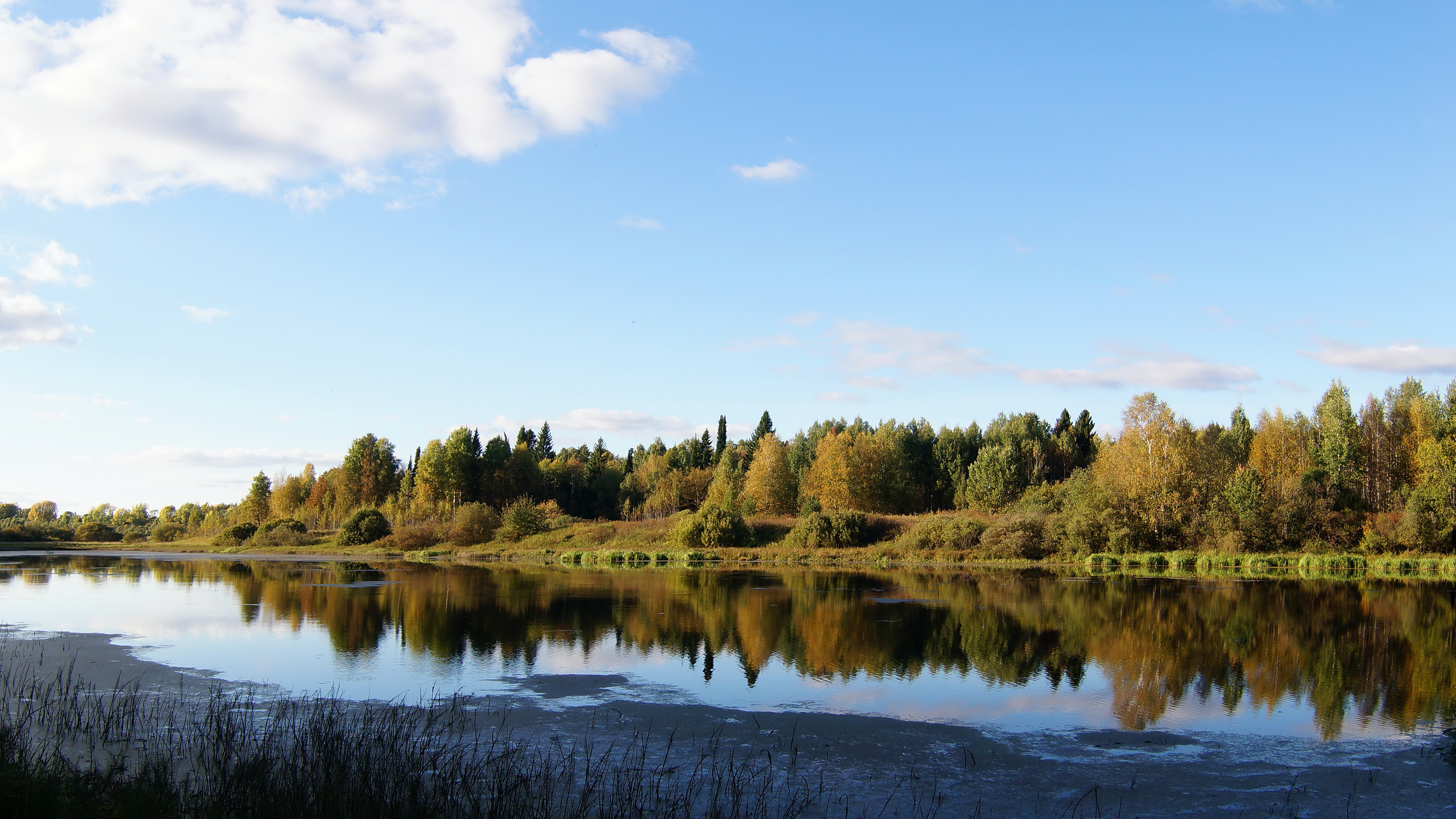
- Lake Artemovskoye, Kirovo-Chepetsky District

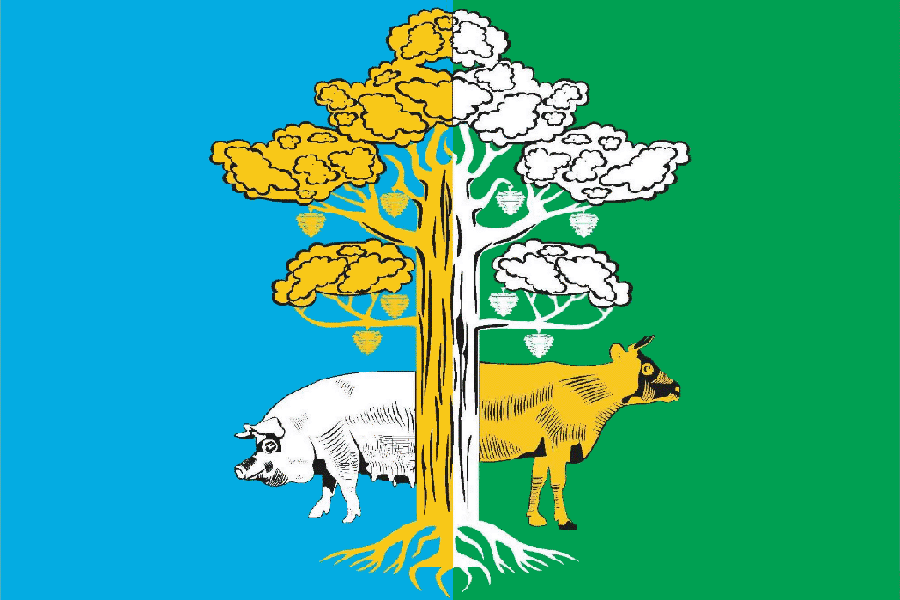
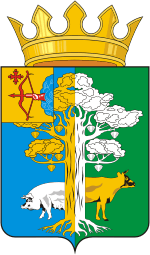
- Flag Coat of arms
- Location of Kirovo-Chepetsky District in Kirov Oblast
- Coordinates: 58°33′N 50°02′E
- Country: Russia
- Federal subject: Kirov Oblast
- Established: 23 February 1960
- Administrative center: Kirovo-Chepetsk

Area
  - Total: 2,210.27 km^{2} (853.39 sq mi)

Population (2010 Census)
  - Total: 21,317
  - Density: 9.6445/km^{2} (24.979/sq mi)
  - Urban: 0%
  - Rural: 100%

Administrative structure
  - Administrative divisions: 13 rural okrug
  - Inhabited localities: 237 rural localities

Municipal structure
  - Municipally incorporated as: Kirovo-Chepetsky Municipal District
  - Municipal divisions: 0 urban settlements, 13 rural settlements
- Time zone: UTC+3 (MSK)
- OKTMO ID: 33618000
- Website: http://www.admkchr.ru/

Kirovo-Chepetsky District (Russian: Ки́рово-Чепе́цкий райо́н) is an administrative and municipal district (raion), one of the thirty-nine in Kirov Oblast, Russia. It is located in the center of the oblast. The area of the district is 2,210.27 square kilometers (853.39 sq mi). Its administrative center is the town of Kirovo-Chepetsk (which is not administratively a part of the district). Population: 21,317 (2010 census); 22,193 (2002 Census); 39,688 (1989 Soviet census).

== Administrative and municipal status ==
Within the framework of administrative divisions, Kirovo-Chepetsky District is one of the thirty-nine in the oblast. The town of Kirovo-Chepetsk serves as its administrative center, despite being incorporated separately as an administrative unit with the status equal to that of the districts.

As a municipal division, the district is incorporated as Kirovo-Chepetsky Municipal District. The Town of Kirovo-Chepetsk is incorporated separately from the district as Kirovo-Chepetsk Urban Okrug.
