= Sovetsky District, Kirov Oblast =

Sovetsky District Советский район (Russian)
- District
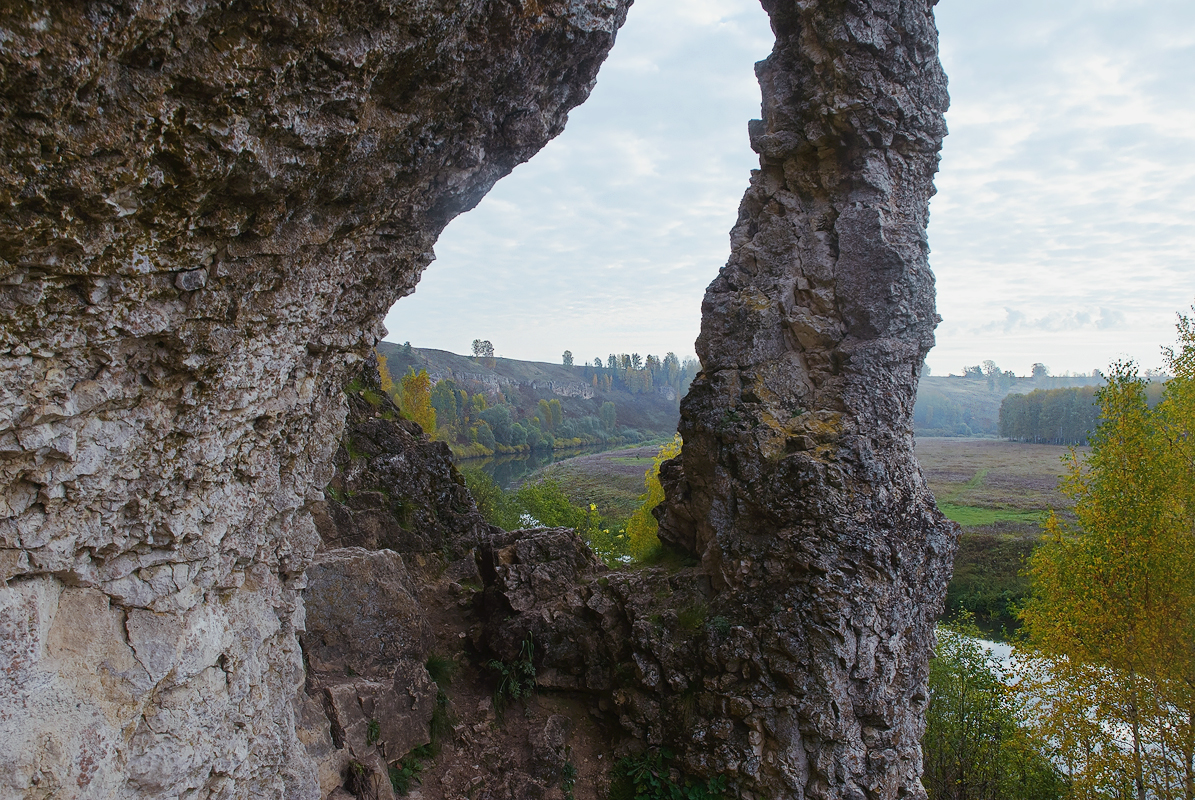
- Chimbulatsky botanical and geological complex, Sovetsky District

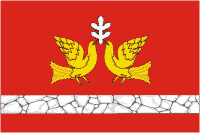
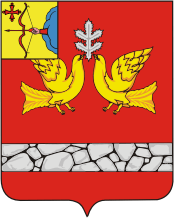
- Flag Coat of arms
- Location of Sovetsky District in Kirov Oblast
- Coordinates: 57°35′N 48°57′E
- Country: Russia
- Federal subject: Kirov Oblast
- Established: 10 June 1929
- Administrative center: Sovetsk

Area
  - Total: 2,411 km^{2} (931 sq mi)

Population (2010 Census)
  - Total: 27,302
  - Density: 11.32/km^{2} (29.33/sq mi)
  - Urban: 60.8%
  - Rural: 39.2%

Administrative structure
  - Administrative divisions: 1 Towns, 10 Rural okrugs
  - Inhabited localities: 1 cities/towns, 115 rural localities

Municipal structure
  - Municipally incorporated as: Sovetsky Municipal District
  - Municipal divisions: 1 urban settlements, 10 rural settlements
- Time zone: UTC+3 (MSK)
- OKTMO ID: 33636000
- Website: http://xn--43-dlcmpgf3a0adk.xn--p1ai/

Sovetsky District (Russian: Сове́тский райо́н) is an administrative and municipal district (raion), one of the thirty-nine in Kirov Oblast, Russia. It is located in the south of the oblast. The area of the district is 2,411 square kilometers (931 sq mi). Its administrative center is the town of Sovetsk. Population: 27,302 (2010 census); 31,840 (2002 Census); 35,368 (1989 Soviet census). The population of Sovetsk accounts for 60.8% of the district's total population.

== People ==
- Vyacheslav Molotov (1890–1986)
- Leonid Govorov (1897–1955)
