= Kholuy, Vologda Oblast =

Kholuy Холуй
- Village
- Location within Vologda Oblast Location within Russia
- Coordinates: 60°25′N 40°12′E
- Country: Russia
- Region: Vologda Oblast
- District: Vozhegodsky District
- Time zone: UTC+3:00

Kholuy (Russian: Холуй) is a rural locality (a village) in Vozhegodskoye Urban Settlement, Vozhegodsky District, Vologda Oblast, Russia. The population was 17 as of 2002.

== Geography ==
Kholuy is located 9 km south of Vozhega (the district's administrative centre) by road. Zadorozhye is the nearest rural locality.
