= Peskovka, Kirov Oblast =

Peskovka Песковка
- Urban-type settlement
- Interactive map of Peskovka
- Location of Peskovka Peskovka (Kirov Oblast)
- Coordinates: 59.0440°N 52.3581°E
- Country: Russia
- Federal subject: Kirov Oblast
- Administrative district: Omutninsky District
- Founded: 1772

Population (2010 Census)
  - Total: 4,724
  - Estimate (2025): 3,211 (−32%)
- Time zone: UTC+3 (MSK)
- Postal code: 612730
- OKTMO ID: 33628162051

Peskovka (Russian: Песковка) is an urban locality (an urban-type settlement) in Omutninsky District of Kirov Oblast, Russia. Population: 4,724 (2010 census); 6,957 (2002 census); 7,888 (1989 Soviet census).
