= Kirovo-Chepetsk =

Town in Kirov Oblast, Russia

Kirovo-Chepetsk Кирово-Чепецк
- Town
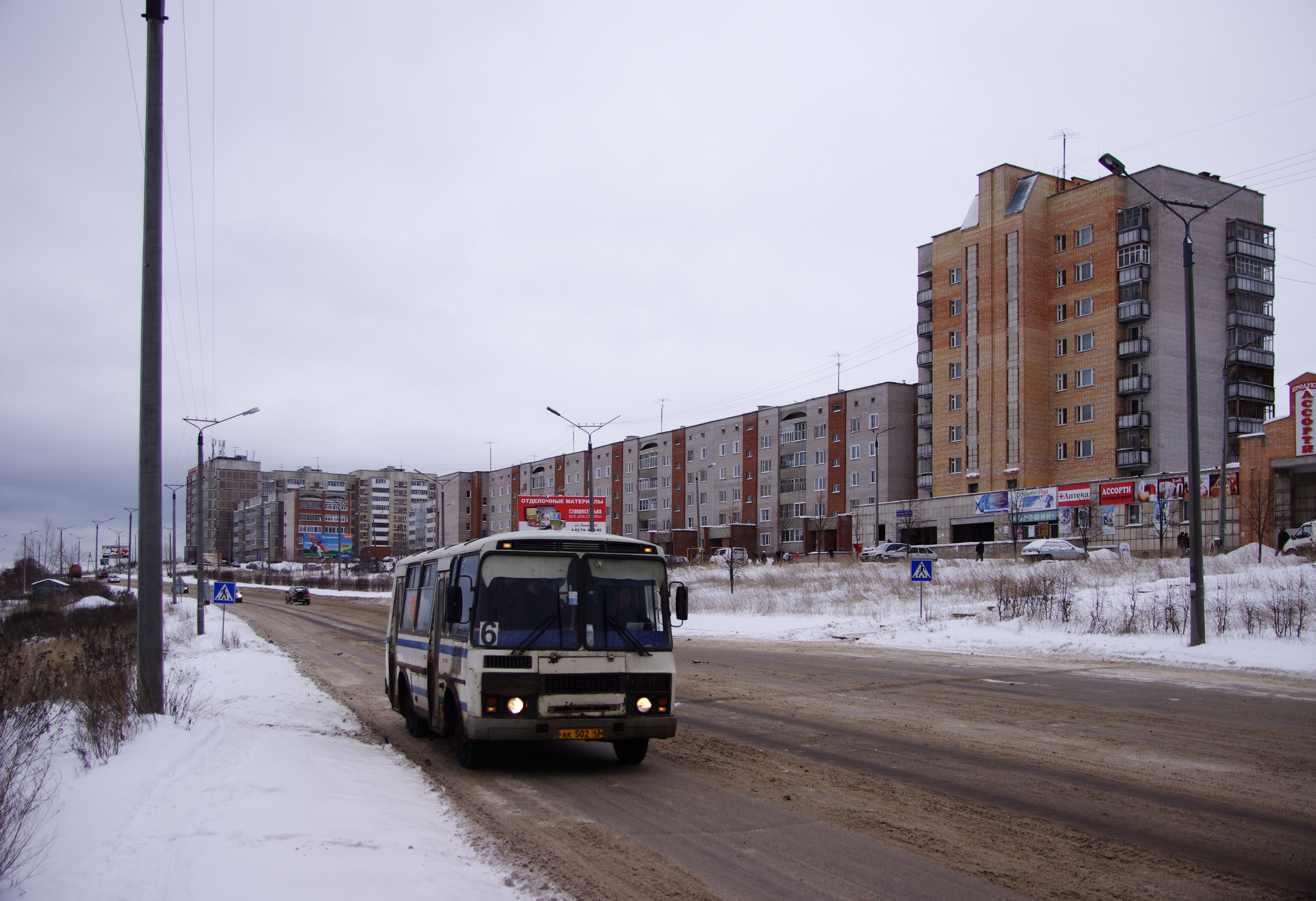
- 60 Let Oktyabrya Street in Kirovo-Chepetsk

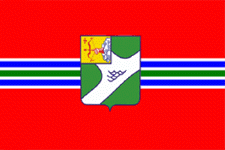
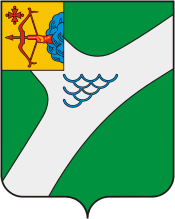
- Flag Coat of arms
- Interactive map of Kirovo-Chepetsk
- Location of Kirovo-Chepetsk Kirovo-Chepetsk (Kirov Oblast)
- Coordinates: 58°33′N 50°00′E
- Country: Russia
- Federal subject: Kirov Oblast
- Founded: mid-15th century
- Town status since: 1955
- Elevation: 140 m (460 ft)

Population (2010 Census)
  - Total: 80,921
  - Estimate (2025): 63,979 (−20.9%)
  - Rank: 204th in 2010

Administrative status
  - Subordinated to: Town of Kirovo-Chepetsk
  - Capital of: Kirovo-Chepetsky District, Town of Kirovo-Chepetsk

Municipal status
  - Urban okrug: Kirovo-Chepetsk Urban Okrug
  - Capital of: Kirovo-Chepetsk Urban Okrug, Kirovo-Chepetsky Municipal District
- Time zone: UTC+3 (MSK)
- Postal code: 613040
- OKTMO ID: 33707000001
- Website: www.k4city.gov-vyatka.ru

Kirovo-Chepetsk (Russian: Ки́рово-Чепе́цк) is a town in Kirov Oblast, Russia, located at the confluence of the Cheptsa and the Vyatka Rivers, 20 kilometers (12 mi) east of Kirov. Population: 80,921 (2010 census); 90,303 (2002 census); 92,382 (1989 Soviet census).

Historical population
Year	Pop.	±%
1959	28,726	—
1970	50,994	+77.5%
1979	71,498	+40.2%
1989	92,382	+29.2%
2002	90,303	−2.3%
2010	80,921	−10.4%
2021	66,651	−17.6%
Source: Census data

== Geography ==
The 50th eastern meridian runs exactly through the town.

== History ==
It was founded in the mid-15th century as the village of Ust-Cheptsa (Усть-Чепца). Town status was granted to it in 1955.

In 1954, an ice hockey team called “Khimik” ("Chemist") was founded in the city. In 1964, the team was named Olimpiya Kirovo-Chepetsk. Famous pupils of the team include Alexander Maltsev, Vladimir Myshkin and Andrey Trefilov.

== Administrative and municipal status ==
Within the framework of administrative divisions, Kirovo-Chepetsk serves as the administrative center of Kirovo-Chepetsky District, even though it is not a part of it. As an administrative division, it is incorporated separately as the Town of Kirovo-Chepetsk—an administrative unit with the status equal to that of the districts. As a municipal division, the Town of Kirovo-Chepetsk is incorporated as Kirovo-Chepetsk Urban Okrug.

== Notable people ==
- Former Soviet national hockey team players Vladimir Myshkin and Alexander Maltsev
- Yury Patrikeyev, Olympic bronze medalist and European champion in wrestling representing Armenia.
