= Kirs, Russia =

Town in Kirov Oblast, Russia

Kirs Кирс
- Town
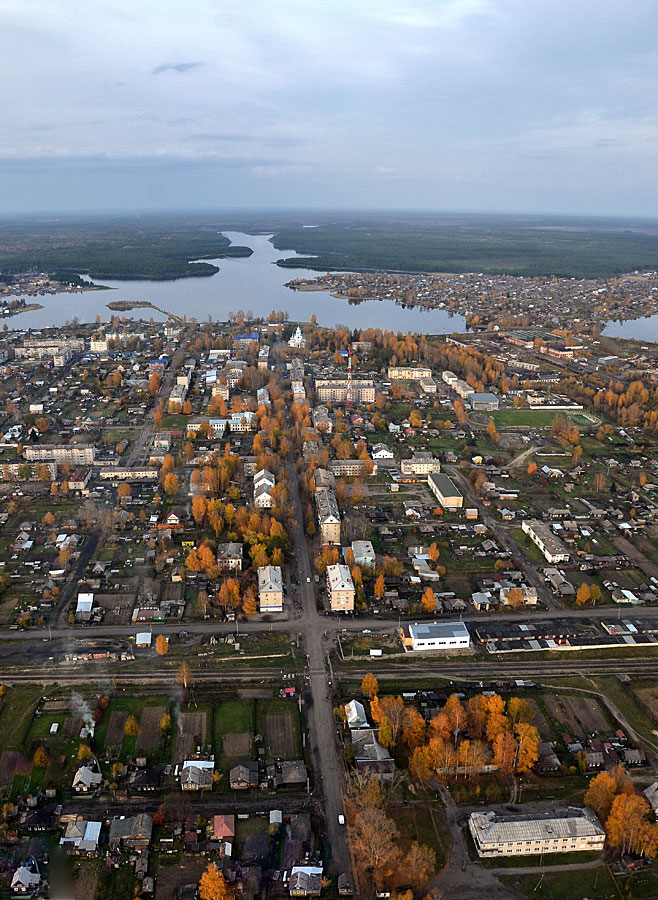
- Aerial view of Kirs

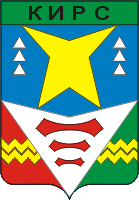
- Coat of arms
- Interactive map of Kirs
- Location of Kirs Kirs (Kirov Oblast)
- Coordinates: 59°21′N 52°15′E
- Country: Russia
- Federal subject: Kirov Oblast
- Administrative district: Verkhnekamsky District
- TownSelsoviet: Kirs
- Founded: 1729
- Town status since: 1965
- Elevation: 160 m (520 ft)

Population (2010 Census)
  - Total: 10,420
  - Estimate (2021): 8,520 (−18.2%)

Administrative status
  - Capital of: Verkhnekamsky District, Town of Kirs

Municipal status
  - Municipal district: Verkhnekamsky Municipal District
  - Urban settlement: Kirsinskoye Urban Settlement
  - Capital of: Verkhnekamsky Municipal District, Kirsinskoye Urban Settlement
- Time zone: UTC+3 (MSK)
- Postal codes: 612820, 612823
- OKTMO ID: 33607101001
- Website: www.kirscity.ru

Kirs (Russian: Кирс) is a town and the administrative center of Verkhnekamsky District in Kirov Oblast, Russia, located on the Kirs River near its confluence with the Vyatka, 281 kilometers (175 mi) northeast of Kirov, the administrative center of the oblast. Population: 10,420 (2010 census); 11,786 (2002 census); 14,200 (1989 Soviet census).

== History ==
It was established as a settlement around a cast iron foundry built in 1729. In 1862, the foundry was retrofitted to produce merchant bars. Town status was granted to Kirs in 1965.

== Administrative and municipal status ==
Within the framework of administrative divisions, Kirs serves as the administrative center of Verkhnekamsky District. As an administrative division, it is, together with six rural localities, incorporated within Verkhnekamsky District as the Town of Kirs. As a municipal division, the Town of Kirs is incorporated within Verkhnekamsky Municipal District as Kirsinskoye Urban Settlement.

== Climate ==
Climate data for Kirs (1991–2020, extremes 1955–present)
| Month | Jan | Feb | Mar | Apr | May | Jun | Jul | Aug | Sep | Oct | Nov | Dec | Year |
|---|---|---|---|---|---|---|---|---|---|---|---|---|---|
| Record high °C (°F) | 3.0 (37.4) | 7.0 (44.6) | 14.0 (57.2) | 26.0 (78.8) | 32.0 (89.6) | 34.6 (94.3) | 36.5 (97.7) | 36.0 (96.8) | 29.6 (85.3) | 23.1 (73.6) | 10.0 (50.0) | 7.0 (44.6) | 36.5 (97.7) |
| Mean daily maximum °C (°F) | −9.4 (15.1) | −7.3 (18.9) | 0.1 (32.2) | 8.6 (47.5) | 17.1 (62.8) | 21.7 (71.1) | 24.1 (75.4) | 20.3 (68.5) | 14.0 (57.2) | 5.4 (41.7) | −3.0 (26.6) | −7.7 (18.1) | 7.0 (44.6) |
| Daily mean °C (°F) | −12.9 (8.8) | −11.8 (10.8) | −4.8 (23.4) | 3.0 (37.4) | 10.4 (50.7) | 15.4 (59.7) | 17.8 (64.0) | 14.6 (58.3) | 9.1 (48.4) | 2.4 (36.3) | −5.5 (22.1) | −10.7 (12.7) | 2.3 (36.1) |
| Mean daily minimum °C (°F) | −16.6 (2.1) | −16.0 (3.2) | −9.4 (15.1) | −2.1 (28.2) | 4.2 (39.6) | 9.4 (48.9) | 11.9 (53.4) | 9.8 (49.6) | 5.2 (41.4) | −0.1 (31.8) | −8.0 (17.6) | −14.0 (6.8) | −2.1 (28.1) |
| Record low °C (°F) | −47.6 (−53.7) | −47.0 (−52.6) | −40.7 (−41.3) | −27.5 (−17.5) | −11.2 (11.8) | −4.8 (23.4) | −0.7 (30.7) | −4.2 (24.4) | −7.2 (19.0) | −26.0 (−14.8) | −38.5 (−37.3) | −51.3 (−60.3) | −51.3 (−60.3) |
| Average precipitation mm (inches) | 42 (1.7) | 29 (1.1) | 39 (1.5) | 38 (1.5) | 54 (2.1) | 81 (3.2) | 72 (2.8) | 72 (2.8) | 61 (2.4) | 66 (2.6) | 52 (2.0) | 45 (1.8) | 651 (25.5) |
Source: Погода и Климат
