= Murygino =

Murygino Мурыгино
- Urban-type settlement
- Interactive map of Murygino
- Location of Murygino Murygino (Kirov Oblast)
- Coordinates: 58.7373°N 49.4614°E
- Country: Russia
- Federal subject: Kirov Oblast
- Administrative district: Yuryansky District
- Founded: 1785
- Elevation: 133 m (436 ft)

Population (2010 Census)
  - Total: 7,665
  - Estimate (2025): 5,883 (−23.2%)
- Time zone: UTC+3 (MSK)
- Postal code: 613641
- OKTMO ID: 33649154051

Murygino (Russian: Мурыгино) is an urban locality (an urban-type settlement) in Yuryansky District of Kirov Oblast, Russia. Population: 7,665 (2010 census); 8,246 (2002 census); 9,021 (1989 Soviet census).
