= Orichi =

Orichi Оричи
- Urban-type settlement
- Interactive map of Orichi
- Location of Orichi Orichi (Kirov Oblast)
- Coordinates: 58.4018°N 49.0574°E
- Country: Russia
- Federal subject: Kirov Oblast
- Administrative district: Orichevsky District
- Elevation: 134 m (440 ft)

Population (2010 Census)
  - Total: 7,962
  - Estimate (2025): 7,332 (−7.9%)
- Time zone: UTC+3 (MSK)
- Postal code: 612080
- OKTMO ID: 33630151051

Orichi (Russian: Оричи) is an urban locality (an urban-type settlement) in Orichevsky District of Kirov Oblast, Russia. Population: 7,962 (2010 census); 8,050 (2002 census); 9,915 (1989 Soviet census).
