= Vakhrushi =

Vakhrushi Вахруши
- Urban-type settlement
- Interactive map of Vakhrushi
- Location of Vakhrushi Vakhrushi (Kirov Oblast)
- Coordinates: 58.6855°N 50.0274°E
- Country: Russia
- Federal subject: Kirov Oblast
- Administrative district: Slobodskoy District
- Founded: 1854

Population (2010 Census)
  - Total: 9,715
  - Estimate (2025): 8,673 (−10.7%)
- Time zone: UTC+3 (MSK)
- Postal codes: 613110, 613111
- OKTMO ID: 33635153051

Vakhrushi (Russian: Вахруши) is an urban locality (an urban-type settlement) in Slobodskoy District of Kirov Oblast, Russia. Population: 9,715 (2010 census); 10,654 (2002 census); 12,269 (1989 Soviet census).
