= Nolinsky District =

Nolinsky District Нолинский район (Russian)
- District
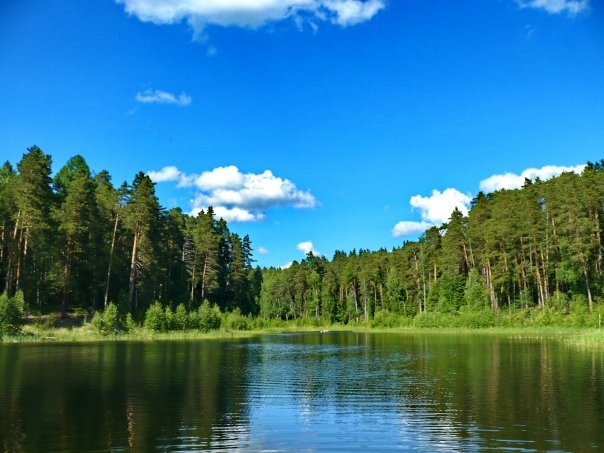
- Lake Chvaniha, Nolinsky District

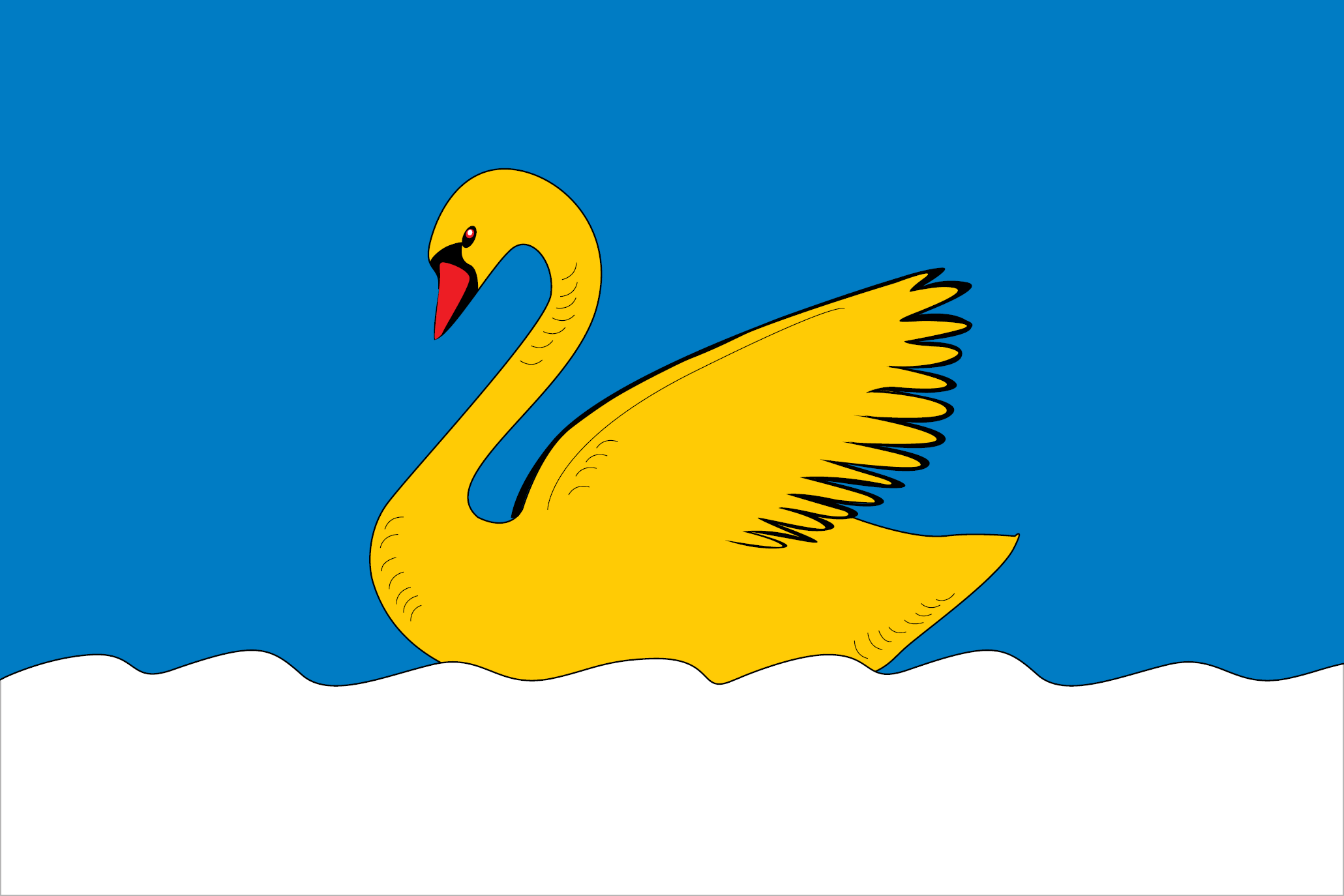
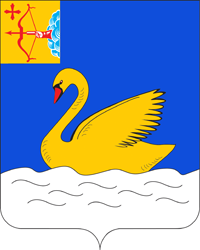
- Flag Coat of arms
- Location of Nolinsky District in Kirov Oblast
- Coordinates: 57°33′N 49°56′E
- Country: Russia
- Federal subject: Kirov Oblast
- Established: 15 July 1929
- Administrative center: Nolinsk

Area
  - Total: 2,140 km^{2} (830 sq mi)

Population (2010 Census)
  - Total: 20,868
  - Density: 9.75/km^{2} (25.3/sq mi)
  - Urban: 55.6%
  - Rural: 44.4%

Administrative structure
  - Administrative divisions: 1 Towns, 1 Urban-type settlements, 8 Rural okrugs
  - Inhabited localities: 1 cities/towns, 1 urban-type settlements, 72 rural localities

Municipal structure
  - Municipally incorporated as: Nolinsky Municipal District
  - Municipal divisions: 2 urban settlements, 8 rural settlements
- Time zone: UTC+3 (MSK)
- OKTMO ID: 33627000
- Website: http://www.adm-nolinska.ru/

Nolinsky District (Russian: Нолинский райо́н) is an administrative and municipal district (raion), one of the thirty-nine in Kirov Oblast, Russia. It is located in the south of the oblast. The area of the district is 2,140 square kilometers (830 sq mi). Its administrative center is the town of Nolinsk. Population: 20,868 (2010 census); 25,170 (2002 Census); 28,780 (1989 Soviet census). The population of Nolinsk accounts for 45.8% of the district's total population.
