= Sovetsk, Kirov Oblast =

Town in Kirov Oblast, Russia

Sovetsk Советск
- Town
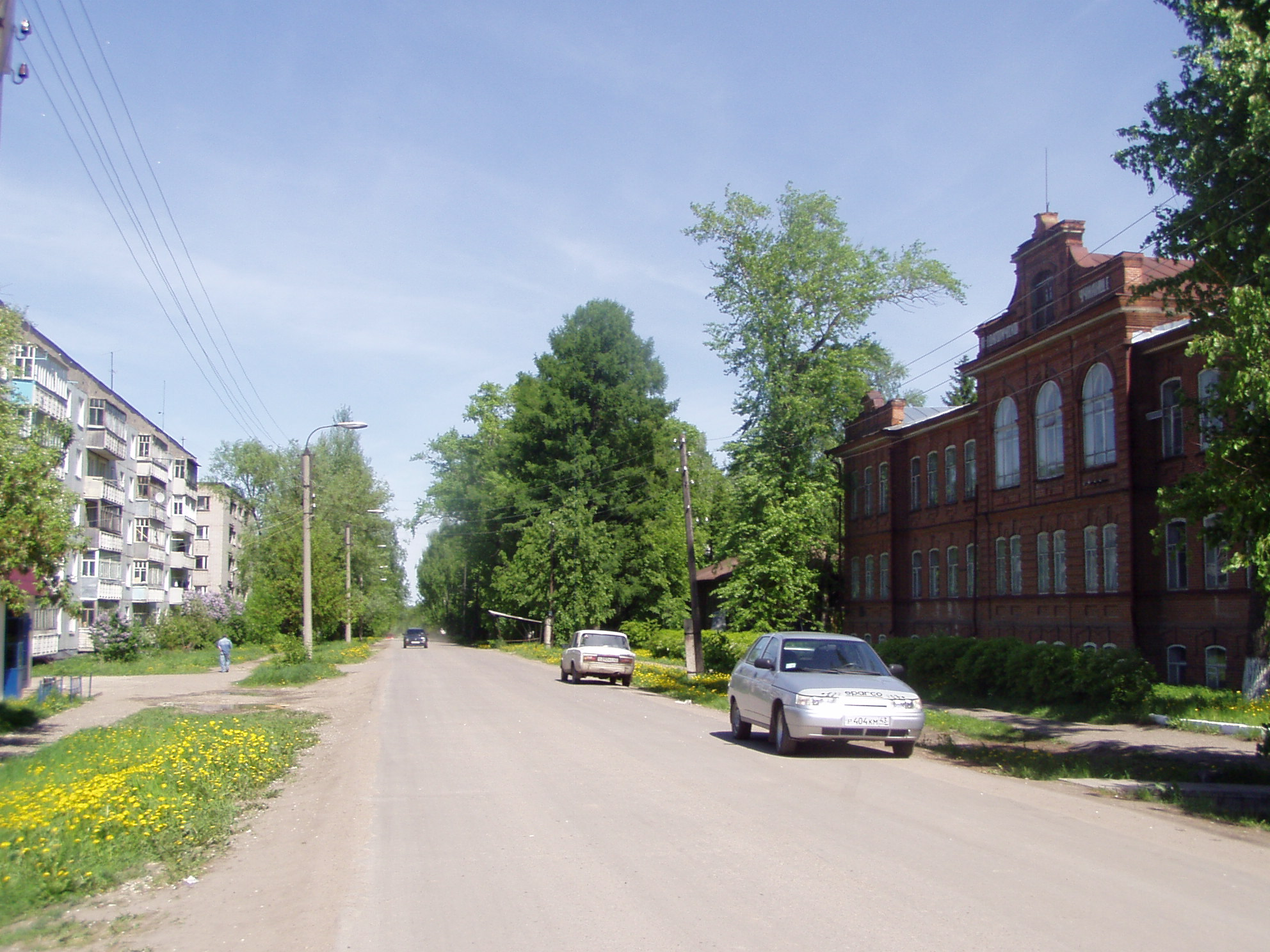
- Solominskaya Street in Sovetsk

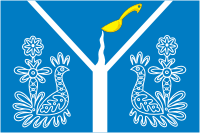
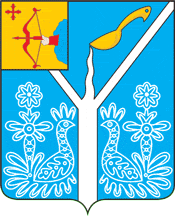
- Flag Coat of arms
- Interactive map of Sovetsk
- Location of Sovetsk Sovetsk (Kirov Oblast)
- Coordinates: 57°35′N 48°59′E
- Country: Russia
- Federal subject: Kirov Oblast
- Administrative district: Sovetsky District
- TownSelsoviet: Sovetsk
- Founded: 1594
- Town status since: 1937
- Elevation: 100 m (330 ft)

Population (2010 Census)
  - Total: 16,598
  - Estimate (2021): 14,626 (−11.9%)

Administrative status
  - Capital of: Sovetsky District, Town of Sovetsk

Municipal status
  - Municipal district: Sovetsky Municipal District
  - Urban settlement: Sovetskoye Urban Settlement
  - Capital of: Sovetsky Municipal District, Sovetskoye Urban Settlement
- Time zone: UTC+3 (MSK)
- Postal codes: 613340, 613341, 613343, 613379
- OKTMO ID: 33636101001
- Website: admsovetsk.ru

Sovetsk (Russian: Сове́тск), formerly Kukarka (Russian: Кука́рка; Mari: Кукарка), is a town and the administrative center of Sovetsky District in Kirov Oblast, Russia. Population: 16,598 (2010 census); 18,167 (2002 census); 19,368 (1989 Soviet census).

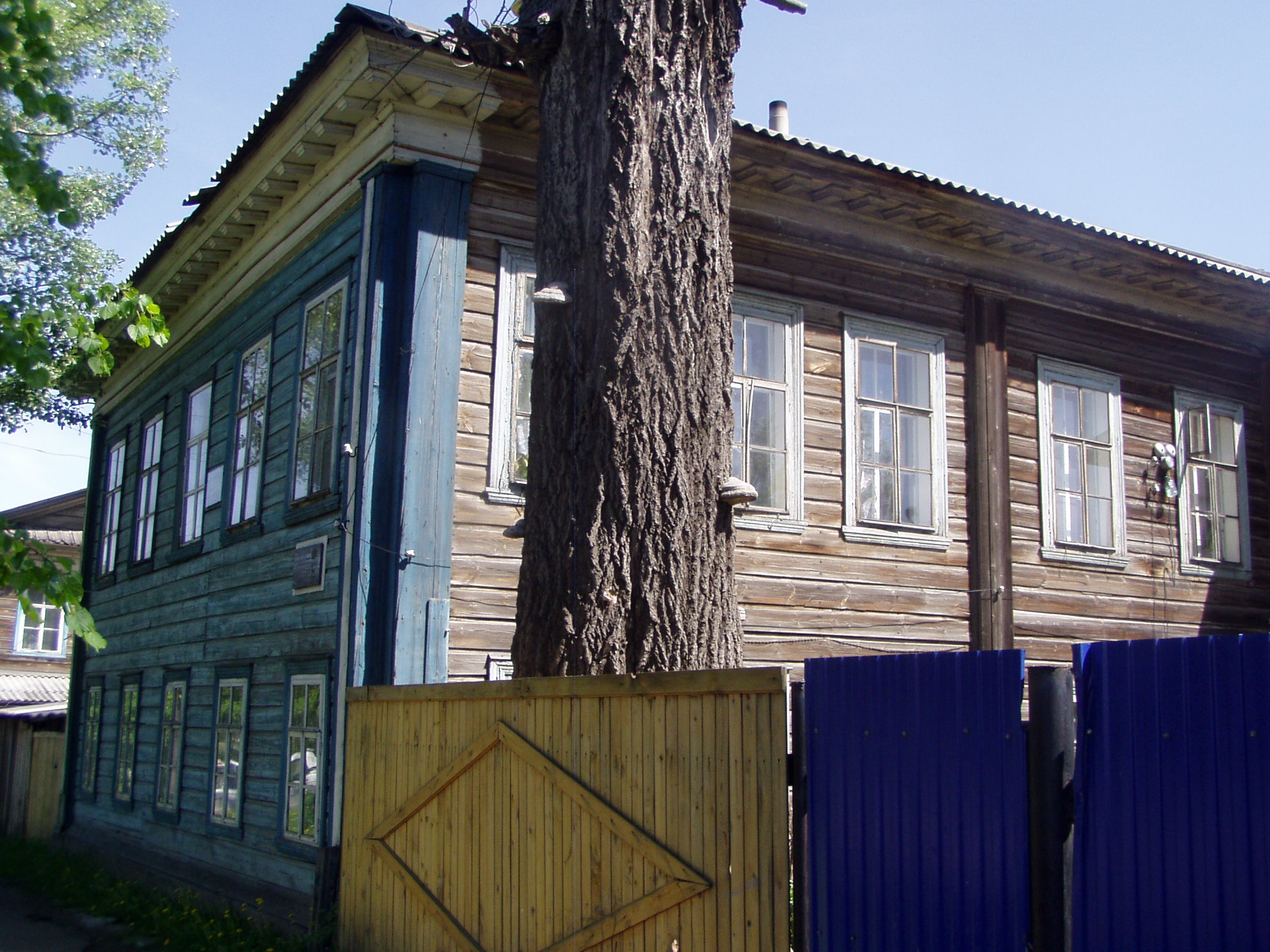
Vyacheslav Molotov's birth house in Sovetsk.

== Etymology ==
The origins of the name "Kukarka" are uncertain. It may derive from Mari words kü (stone) and karman (fortress) or from kugyrak (great). Attempts have been made to trace it to either Udmurt (kar "town") or Turkic (kukar "burned-away forest"). It is not related to the Russian word "кухарка" (kukharka, "female cook").

== History ==
In the 12th century, it was a capital of the local principality of Chumbylat, a renowned Mari leader and warrior. Kukarka was occupied in 1594 by Russians during colonization of Mari land. Later it was a sloboda in Vyatka Governorate of the Russian Empire. It was granted urban-type settlement status in 1918. Town status was granted to it in 1937, at which time its name was changed by the Soviet government into Sovetsk (lit. Sovietsk).

== Administrative and municipal status ==
Within the framework of administrative divisions, Sovetsk serves as the administrative center of Sovetsky District. As an administrative division, it is incorporated within Sovetsky District as the Town of Sovetsk. As a municipal division, the Town of Sovetsk is incorporated within Sovetsky Municipal District as Sovetskoye Urban Settlement.

== Notable people ==
Sovetsk is the birthplace of Vyacheslav Molotov.
