= Podosinovets, Kirov Oblast =

Podosinovets Подосиновец
- Urban-type settlement
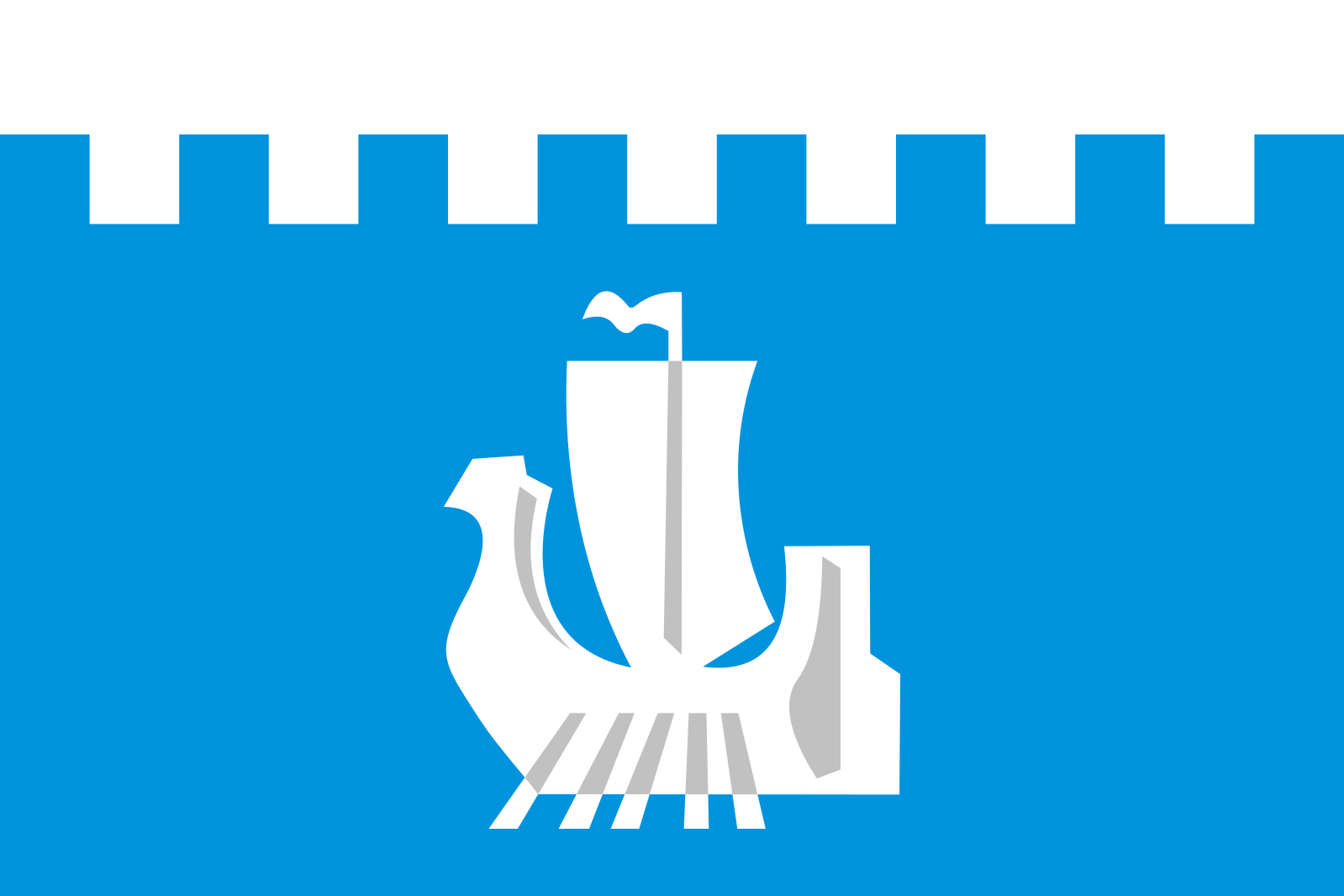
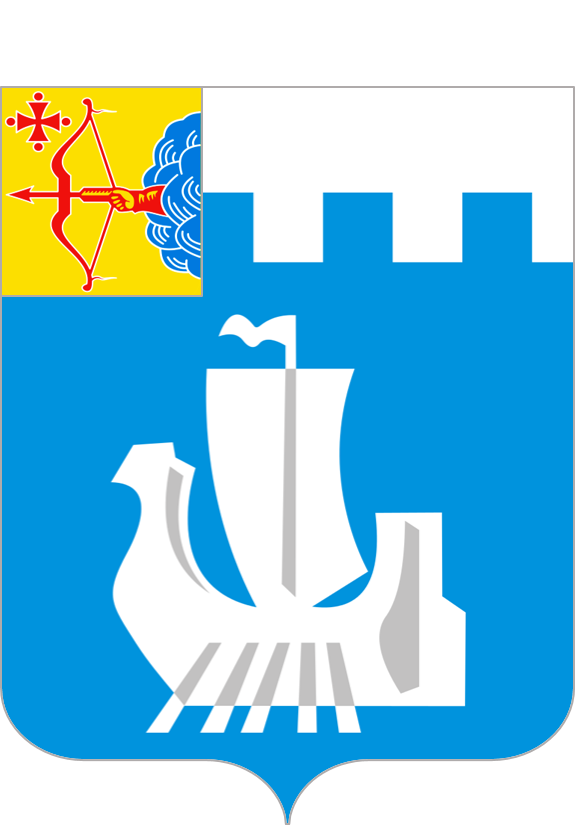
- Flag Coat of arms
- Interactive map of Podosinovets
- Location of Podosinovets Podosinovets (Kirov Oblast)
- Coordinates: 60.2792°N 47.0666°E
- Country: Russia
- Federal subject: Kirov Oblast
- Administrative district: Podosinovsky District
- Founded: 1486

Population (2010 Census)
  - Total: 4,029
  - Estimate (2025): 3,157 (−21.6%)
- Time zone: UTC+3 (MSK)
- Postal code: 613930
- OKTMO ID: 33632151051

Podosinovets (Russian: Подосиновец) is an urban locality (an urban-type settlement) in Podosinovsky District of Kirov Oblast, Russia. Population: 4,029 (2010 census); 4,235 (2002 census); 4,378 (1989 Soviet census).
