= Kumyonsky District =

Kumyonsky District Кумёнский район (Russian)
- District
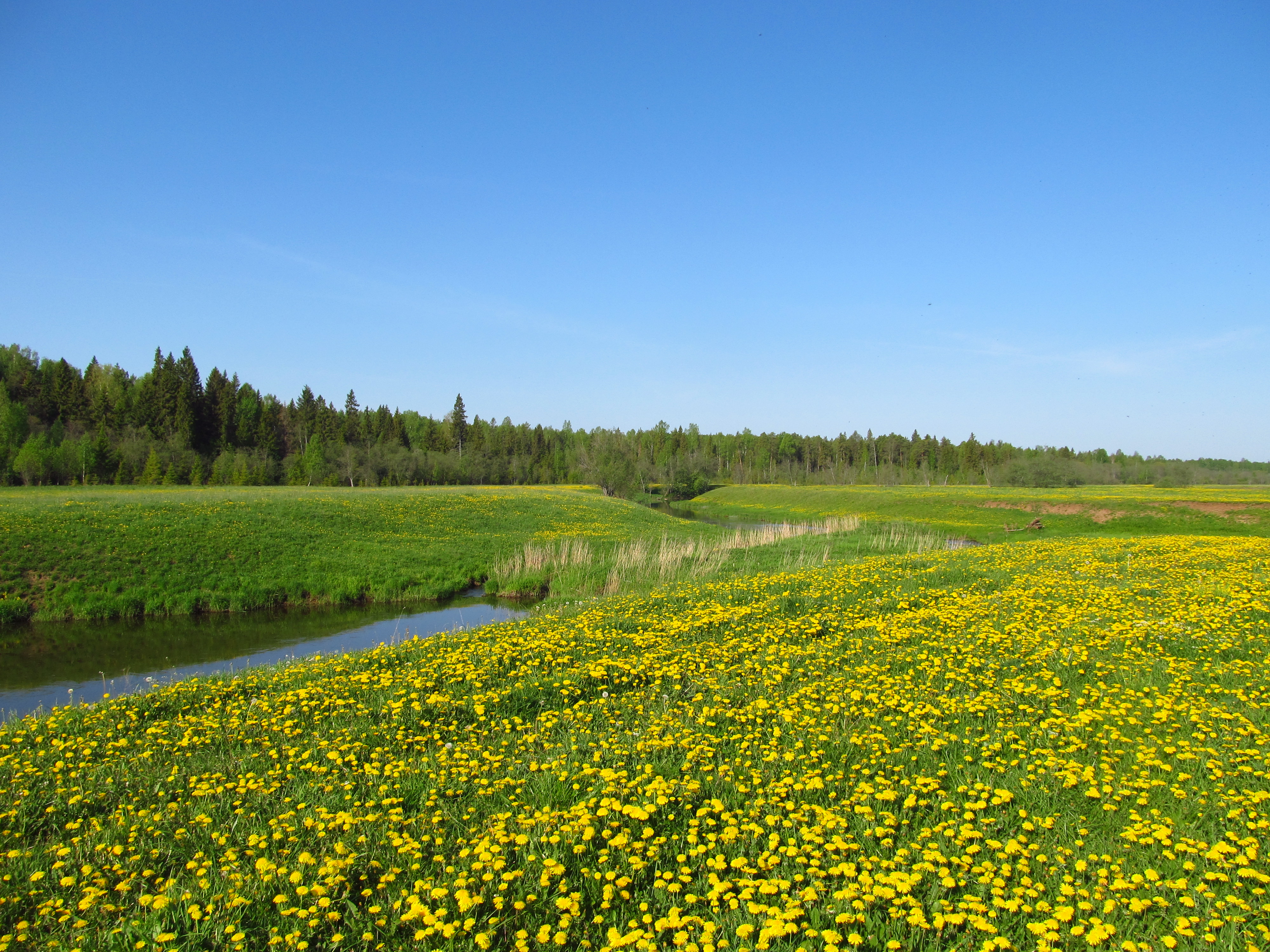
- Floodplain of the Bistrica River, Kumyonsky District

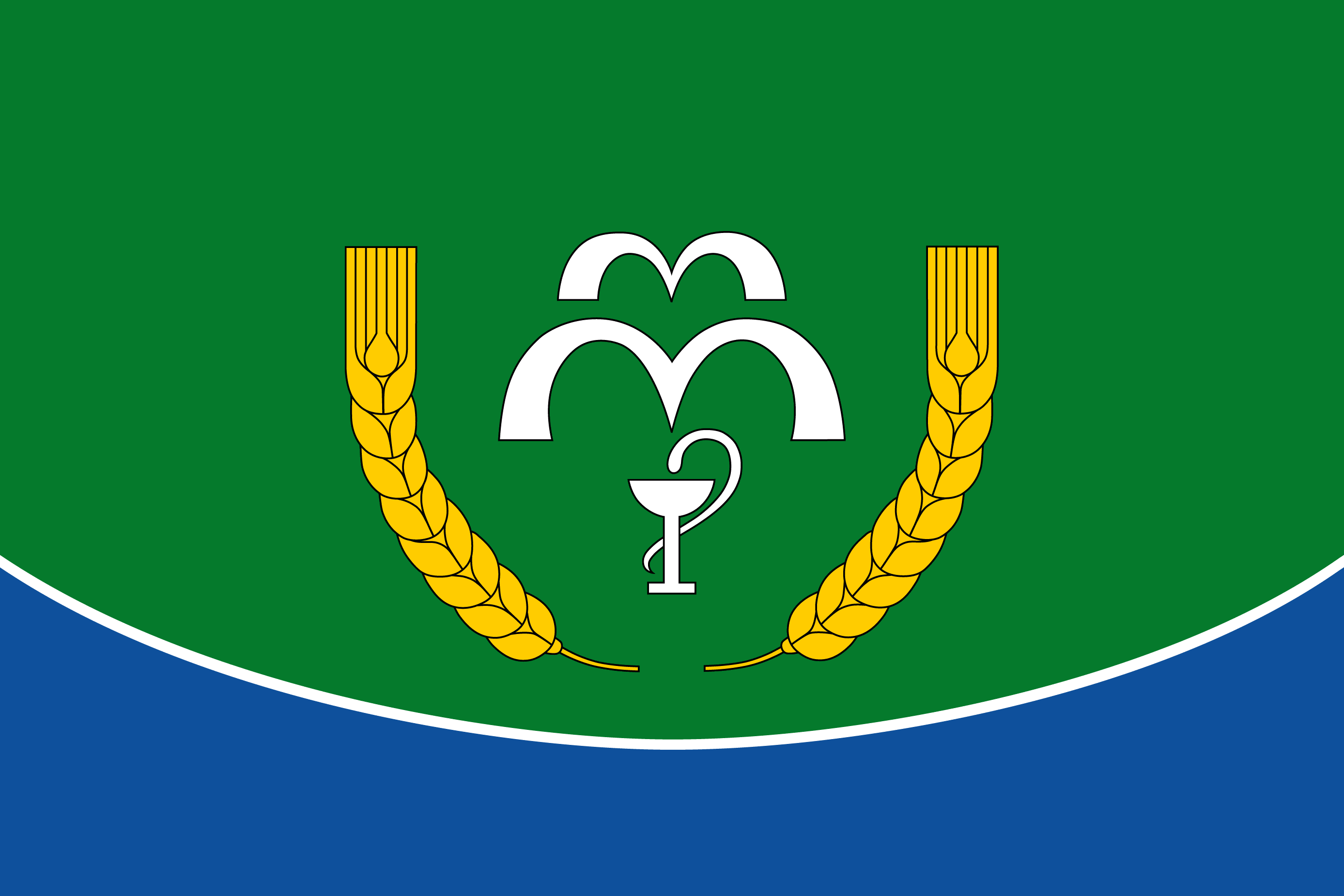
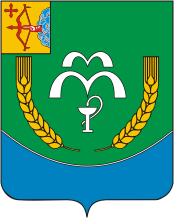
- Flag Coat of arms
- Location of Kumyonsky District in Kirov Oblast
- Coordinates: 58°06′46″N 49°55′02″E
- Country: Russia
- Federal subject: Kirov Oblast
- Established: 1935
- Administrative center: Kumyony

Area
  - Total: 1,911 km^{2} (738 sq mi)

Population (2010 Census)
  - Total: 17,350
  - Density: 9.079/km^{2} (23.51/sq mi)
  - Urban: 39.8%
  - Rural: 60.2%

Administrative structure
  - Administrative divisions: 2 Urban-type settlements, 7 Rural okrugs
  - Inhabited localities: 2 urban-type settlements, 117 rural localities

Municipal structure
  - Municipally incorporated as: Kumyonsky Municipal District
  - Municipal divisions: 2 urban settlements, 7 rural settlements
- Time zone: UTC+3 (MSK)
- OKTMO ID: 33620000
- Website: https://kumensky.ru/

Kumyonsky District (Russian: Кумёнский райо́н) is an administrative and municipal district (raion), one of the thirty-nine in Kirov Oblast, Russia. It is located in the center of the oblast. The area of the district is 1,911 square kilometers (738 sq mi). Its administrative center is the urban locality (an urban-type settlement) of Kumyony. Population: 17,350 (2010 census); 19,472 (2002 Census); 21,445 (1989 Soviet census). The population of Kumyony accounts for 27.8% of the district's total population.
