= Podosinovsky District =

Podosinovsky District Подосиновский район (Russian)
- District
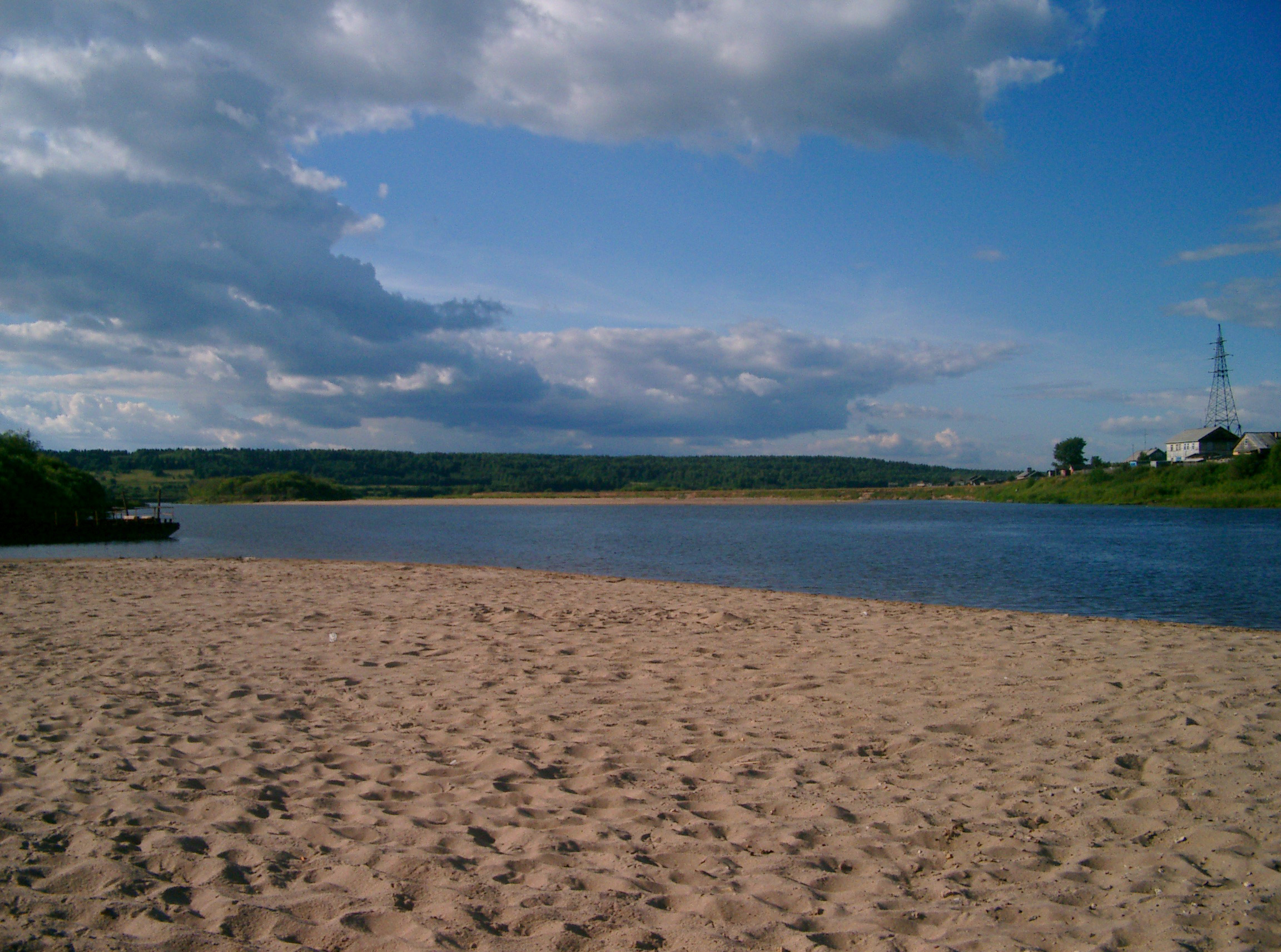
- The Yug River in Podosinovets

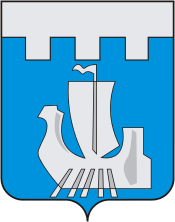
- Flag Coat of arms
- Location of Podosinovsky District in Kirov Oblast
- Coordinates: 60°16′06″N 47°04′31″E
- Country: Russia
- Federal subject: Kirov Oblast
- Established: 10 April 1924
- Administrative center: Podosinovets

Area
  - Total: 4,265 km^{2} (1,647 sq mi)

Population (2010 Census)
  - Total: 17,009
  - Density: 3.988/km^{2} (10.33/sq mi)
  - Urban: 70.1%
  - Rural: 29.9%

Administrative structure
  - Administrative divisions: 3 Urban-type settlements, 3 Rural okrugs
  - Inhabited localities: 3 urban-type settlements, 154 rural localities

Municipal structure
  - Municipally incorporated as: Podosinovsky Municipal District
  - Municipal divisions: 3 urban settlements, 3 rural settlements
- Time zone: UTC+3 (MSK)
- OKTMO ID: 33632000
- Website: http://www.municipal.kirovreg.ru/podosinovsky/

Podosinovsky District (Russian: Подоси́новский райо́н) is an administrative and municipal district (raion), one of the thirty-nine in Kirov Oblast, Russia. It is located in the northwest of the oblast. The area of the district is 4,265 square kilometers (1,647 sq mi). Its administrative center is the urban locality (an urban-type settlement) of Podosinovets. Population: 17,009 (2010 census); 21,649 (2002 Census); 25,559 (1989 Soviet census). The population of Podosinovets accounts for 23.7% of the district's total population.
