= Vyatskopolyansky District =

Vyatskopolyansky District Вятскополянский район (Russian)
- District
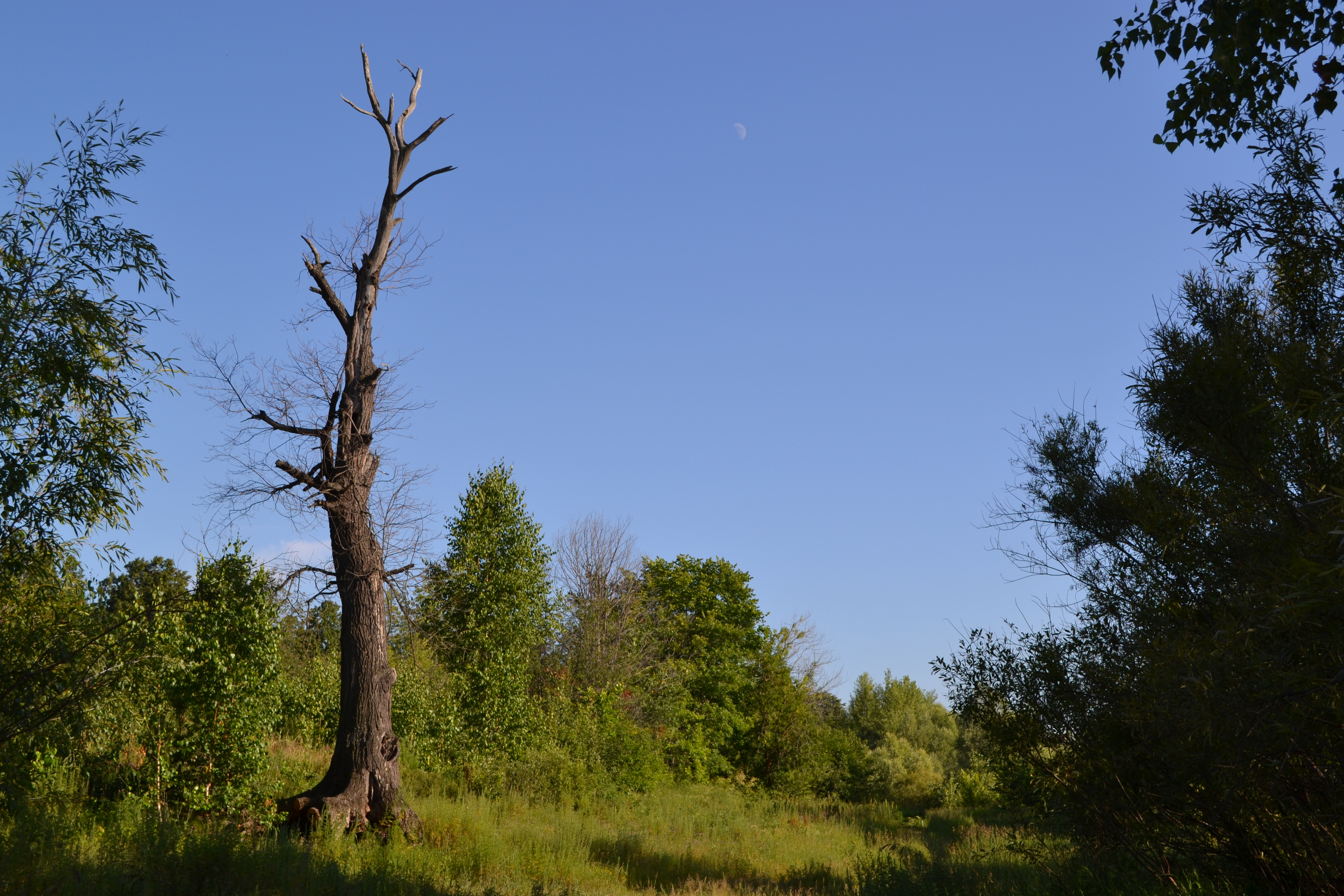
- Forest in Vyatskopolyansky District

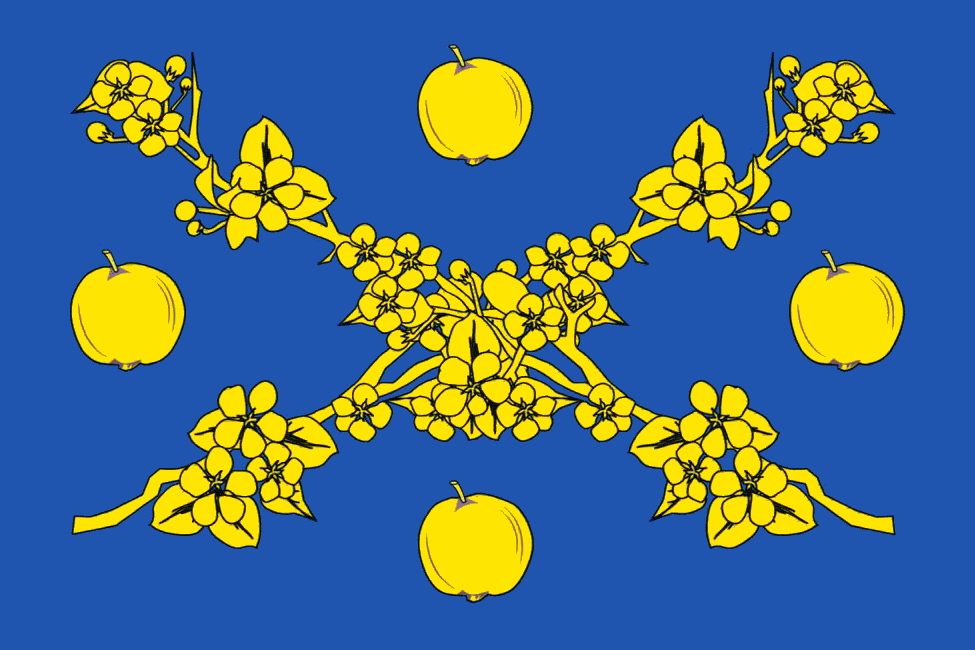
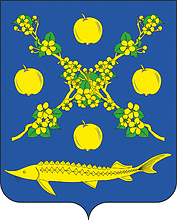
- Flag Coat of arms
- Location of Vyatskopolyansky District in Kirov Oblast
- Coordinates: 56°13′N 51°04′E
- Country: Russia
- Federal subject: Kirov Oblast
- Established: 29 July 1929
- Administrative center: Vyatskiye Polyany

Area
  - Total: 907.71 km^{2} (350.47 sq mi)

Population (2010 Census)
  - Total: 30,659
  - Density: 33.776/km^{2} (87.480/sq mi)
  - Urban: 61.1%
  - Rural: 38.9%

Administrative structure
  - Administrative divisions: 1 Towns, 1 Urban-type settlements, 1 Rural okrugs
  - Inhabited localities: 1 cities/towns, 1 urban-type settlements, 41 rural localities

Municipal structure
  - Municipally incorporated as: Vyatskopolyansky Municipal District
  - Municipal divisions: 2 urban settlements, 11 rural settlements
- Time zone: UTC+3 (MSK)
- OKTMO ID: 33610000
- Website: http://www.vpolyansky-rayon.ru

Vyatskopolyansky District (Russian: Вя́тскополя́нский райо́н), sometimes spelled Vyatsko-Polyansky District (Вя́тско-Поля́нский район), is an administrative and municipal district (raion), one of the thirty-nine in Kirov Oblast, Russia. It is located in the southeast of the oblast. The area of the district is 907.71 square kilometers (350.47 sq mi). Its administrative center is the town of Vyatskiye Polyany (which is not administratively a part of the district). Population: 30,659 (2010 census); 34,044 (2002 Census); 38,451 (1989 Soviet census).

== Administrative and municipal status ==
Within the framework of administrative divisions, Vyatskopolyansky District is one of the thirty-nine in the oblast. The town of Vyatskiye Polyany serves as its administrative center, despite being incorporated separately as an administrative unit with the status equal to that of the districts.

As a municipal division, the district is incorporated as Vyatskopolyansky Municipal District. The Town of Vyatskiye Polyany is incorporated separately from the district as Vyatskiye Polyany Urban Okrug.
