= Orichevsky District =

Orichevsky District Оричевский район (Russian)
- District
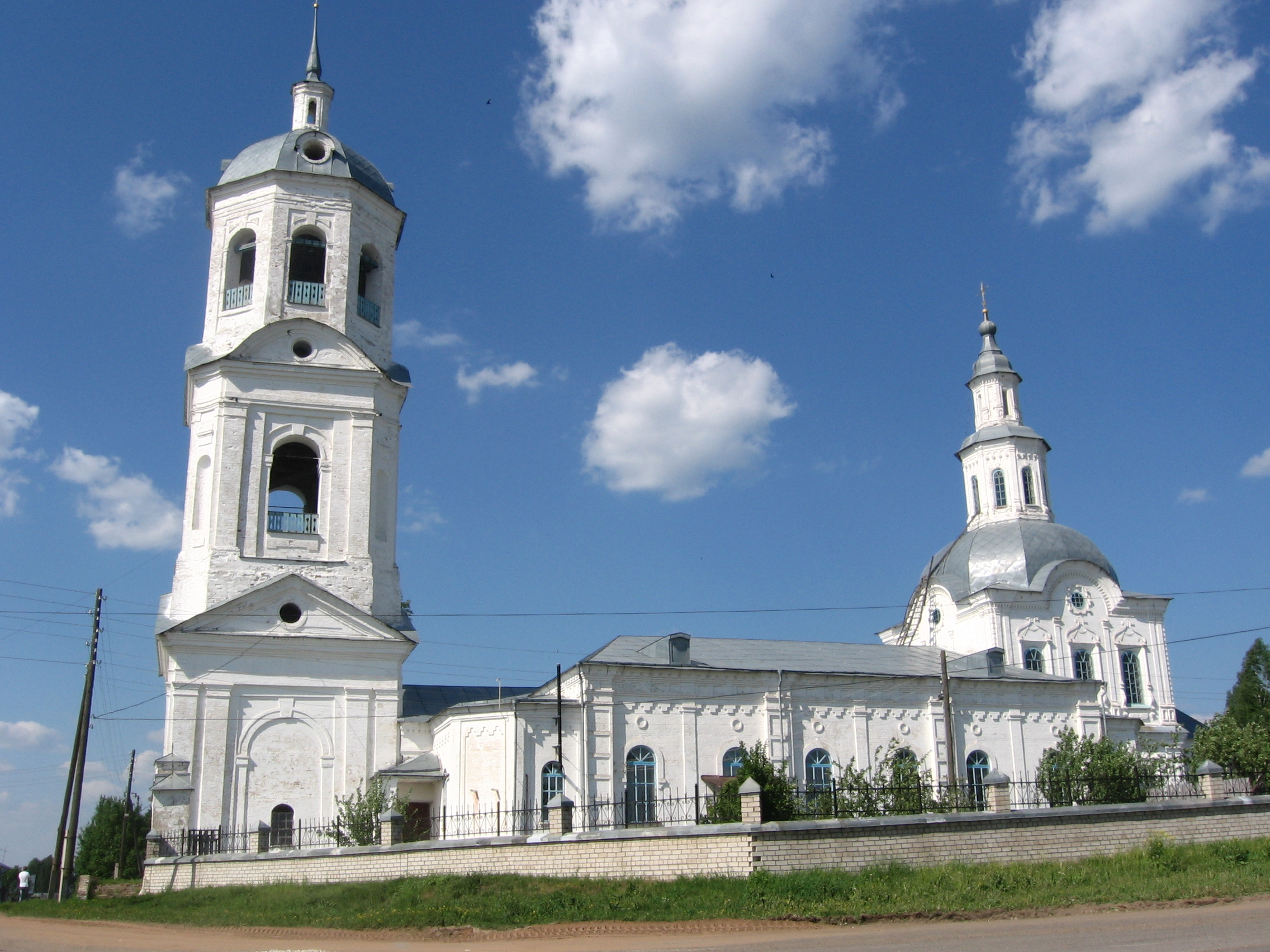
- Church of Zosima and Savvatiy of Solovki village Korshikov, Orichevsky District, 1777

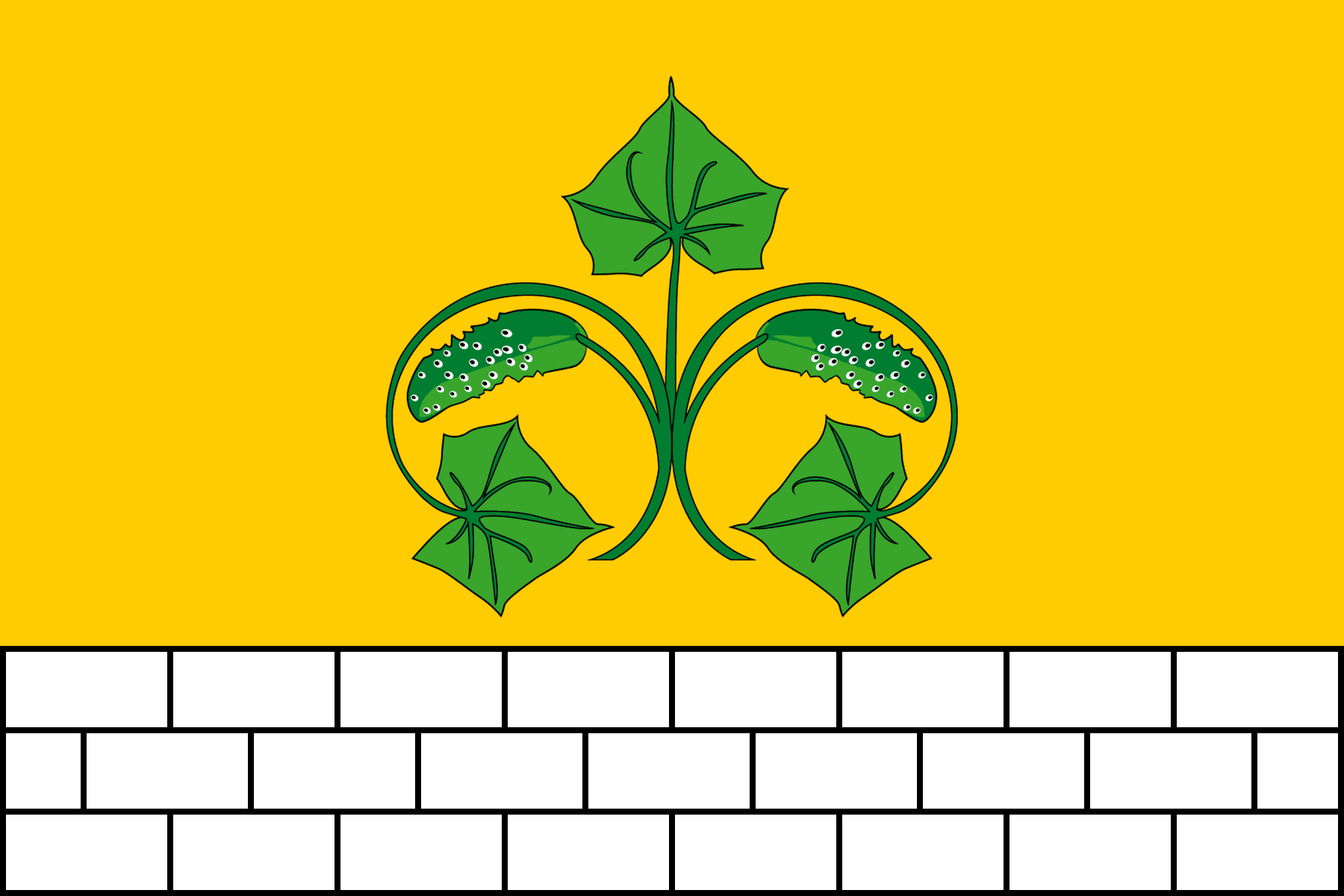
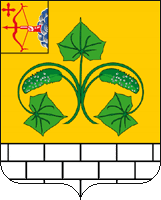
- Flag Coat of arms
- Location of Orichevsky District in Kirov Oblast
- Coordinates: 58°24′14″N 49°03′38″E
- Country: Russia
- Federal subject: Kirov Oblast
- Established: 15 July 1929
- Administrative center: Orichi

Area
  - Total: 2,352 km^{2} (908 sq mi)

Population (2010 Census)
  - Total: 30,781
  - Density: 13.09/km^{2} (33.90/sq mi)
  - Urban: 57.7%
  - Rural: 42.3%

Administrative structure
  - Administrative divisions: 4 Urban-type settlements, 14 Rural okrugs
  - Inhabited localities: 4 urban-type settlements, 226 rural localities

Municipal structure
  - Municipally incorporated as: Orichevsky Municipal District
  - Municipal divisions: 4 urban settlements, 14 rural settlements
- Time zone: UTC+3 (MSK)
- OKTMO ID: 33630000
- Website: http://www.orichi-rayon.ru/

Orichevsky District (Russian: Оричевский райо́н) is an administrative and municipal district (raion), one of the thirty-nine in Kirov Oblast, Russia. It is located in the center of the oblast. The area of the district is 2,352 square kilometers (908 sq mi). Its administrative center is the urban locality (an urban-type settlement) of Orichi. Population: 30,781 (2010 census); 32,764 (2002 Census); 36,425 (1989 Soviet census). The population of Orichi accounts for 25.9% of the district's total population.

== Economy and transportation ==
The Pishchalskoye peat narrow-gauge railway for hauling peat operates in the district.
