= Verkhnekamsky District =

Verkhnekamsky District Верхнекамский район (Russian)
- District
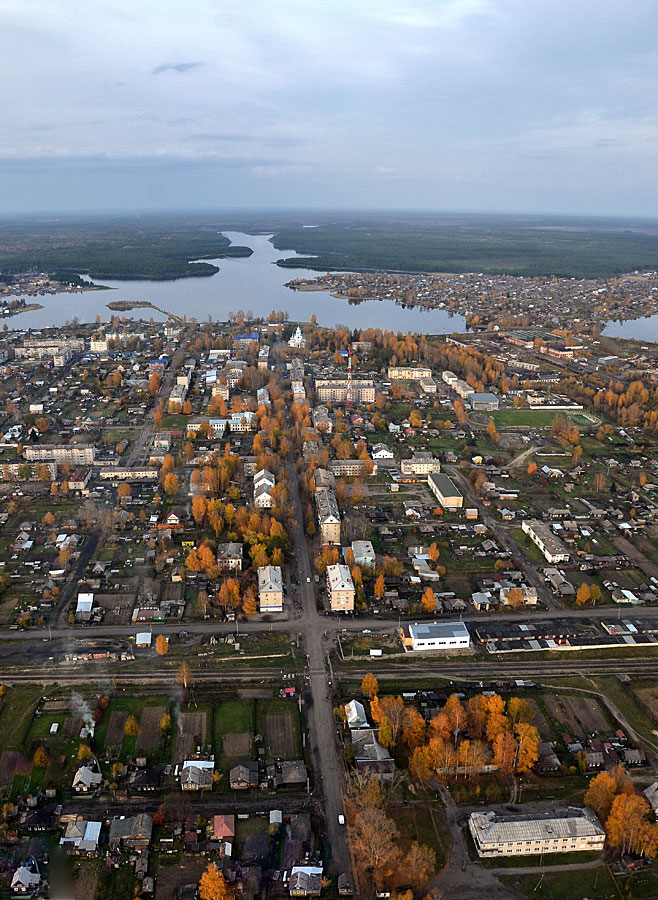
- Aerial view of Kirs, Verkhnekamsky District

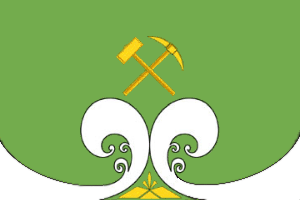
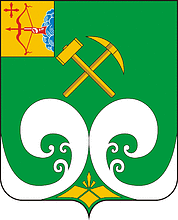
- Flag Coat of arms
- Location of Verkhnekamsky District in Kirov Oblast
- Coordinates: 59°20′N 52°14′E
- Country: Russia
- Federal subject: Kirov Oblast
- Established: 12 January 1965
- Administrative center: Kirs

Area
  - Total: 10,297 km^{2} (3,976 sq mi)

Population (2010 Census)
  - Total: 32,669
  - Density: 3.1727/km^{2} (8.2172/sq mi)
  - Urban: 73.0%
  - Rural: 27.0%

Administrative structure
  - Administrative divisions: 1 Towns, 3 Urban-type settlements, 5 Rural okrugs
  - Inhabited localities: 1 cities/towns, 3 urban-type settlements, 56 rural localities

Municipal structure
  - Municipally incorporated as: Verkhnekamsky Municipal District
  - Municipal divisions: 4 urban settlements, 5 rural settlements
- Time zone: UTC+3 (MSK)
- OKTMO ID: 33607000
- Website: Kirovreg

Verkhnekamsky District (Russian: Верхнека́мский райо́н) is an administrative and municipal district (raion), one of the thirty-nine in Kirov Oblast, Russia. It is located in the northeast of the oblast. The area of the district is 10,297 square kilometers (3,976 sq mi). Its administrative center is the town of Kirs. Population: 32,669 (2010 census); 39,643 (2002 Census); 54,171 (1989 Soviet census). The population of Kirs accounts for 31.9% of the district's total population.

== Economy and transportation ==
The Dymnoye peat narrow-gauge railway for hauling peat operates in the district.
