= Omutninsky District =

Omutninsky District Омутнинский район (Russian)
- District
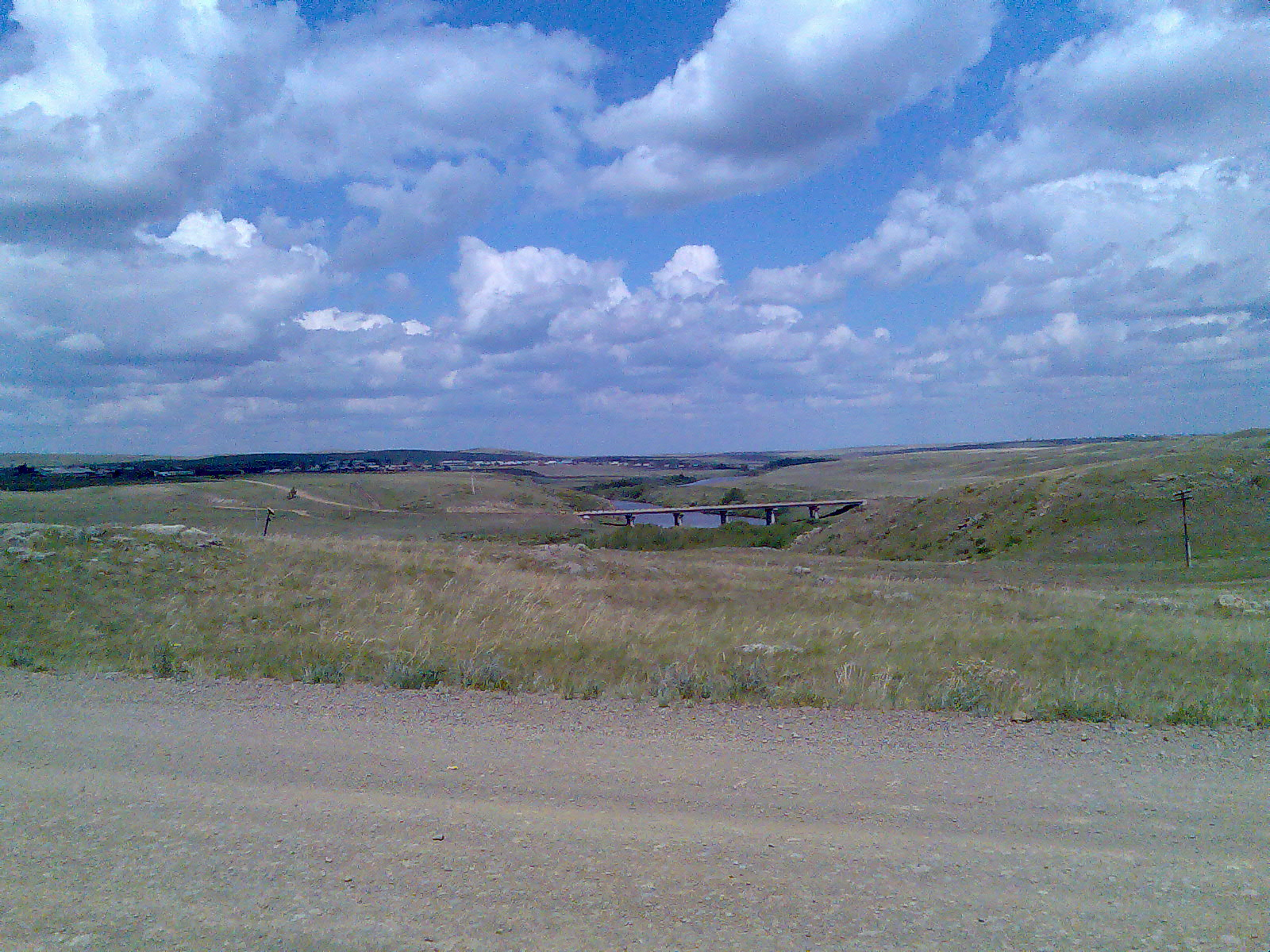
- Landscape in Omutninsky District

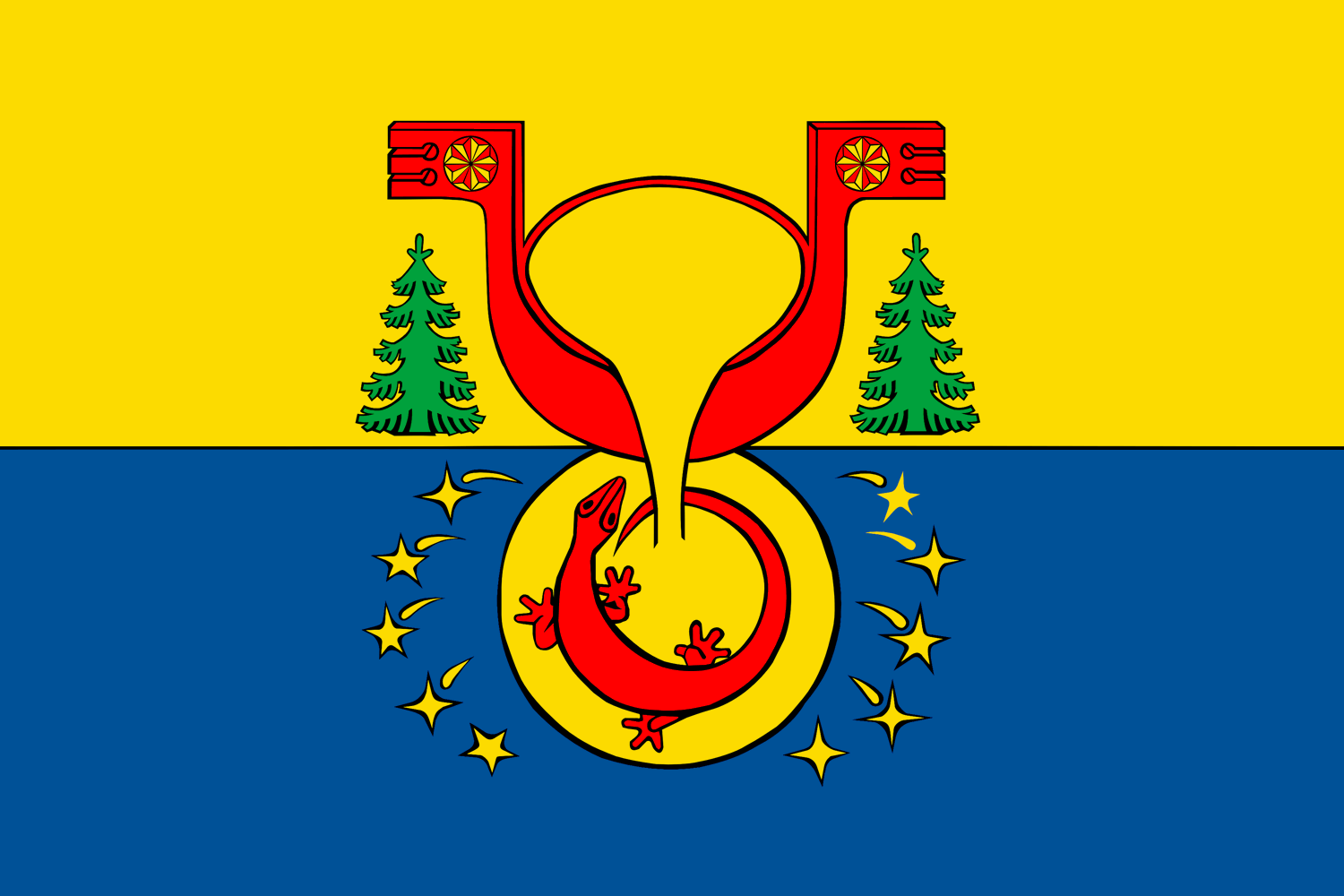
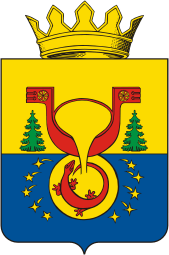
- Flag Coat of arms
- Location of Omutninsky District in Kirov Oblast
- Coordinates: 58°40′N 52°11′E
- Country: Russia
- Federal subject: Kirov Oblast
- Established: 29 July 1929
- Administrative center: Omutninsk

Area
  - Total: 5,171 km^{2} (1,997 sq mi)

Population (2010 Census)
  - Total: 44,793
  - Density: 8.662/km^{2} (22.44/sq mi)
  - Urban: 79.4%
  - Rural: 20.6%

Administrative structure
  - Administrative divisions: 1 Towns, 2 Urban-type settlements, 6 Rural okrugs
  - Inhabited localities: 1 cities/towns, 2 urban-type settlements, 48 rural localities

Municipal structure
  - Municipally incorporated as: Omutninsky Municipal District
  - Municipal divisions: 3 urban settlements, 6 rural settlements
- Time zone: UTC+3 (MSK)
- OKTMO ID: 33628000
- Website: http://omutninsky.ru/

Omutninsky District (Russian: Омутни́нский райо́н) is an administrative and municipal district (raion), one of the thirty-nine in Kirov Oblast, Russia. It is located in the east of the oblast. The area of the district is 5,171 square kilometers (1,997 sq mi). Its administrative center is the town of Omutninsk. Population: 44,793 (2010 census); 51,406 (2002 Census); 59,218 (1989 Soviet census). The population of Omutninsk accounts for 52.7% of the district's total population.
