= Otvorskoye peat railway =

Coordinates: 58.0752729°N 47.6715059°E

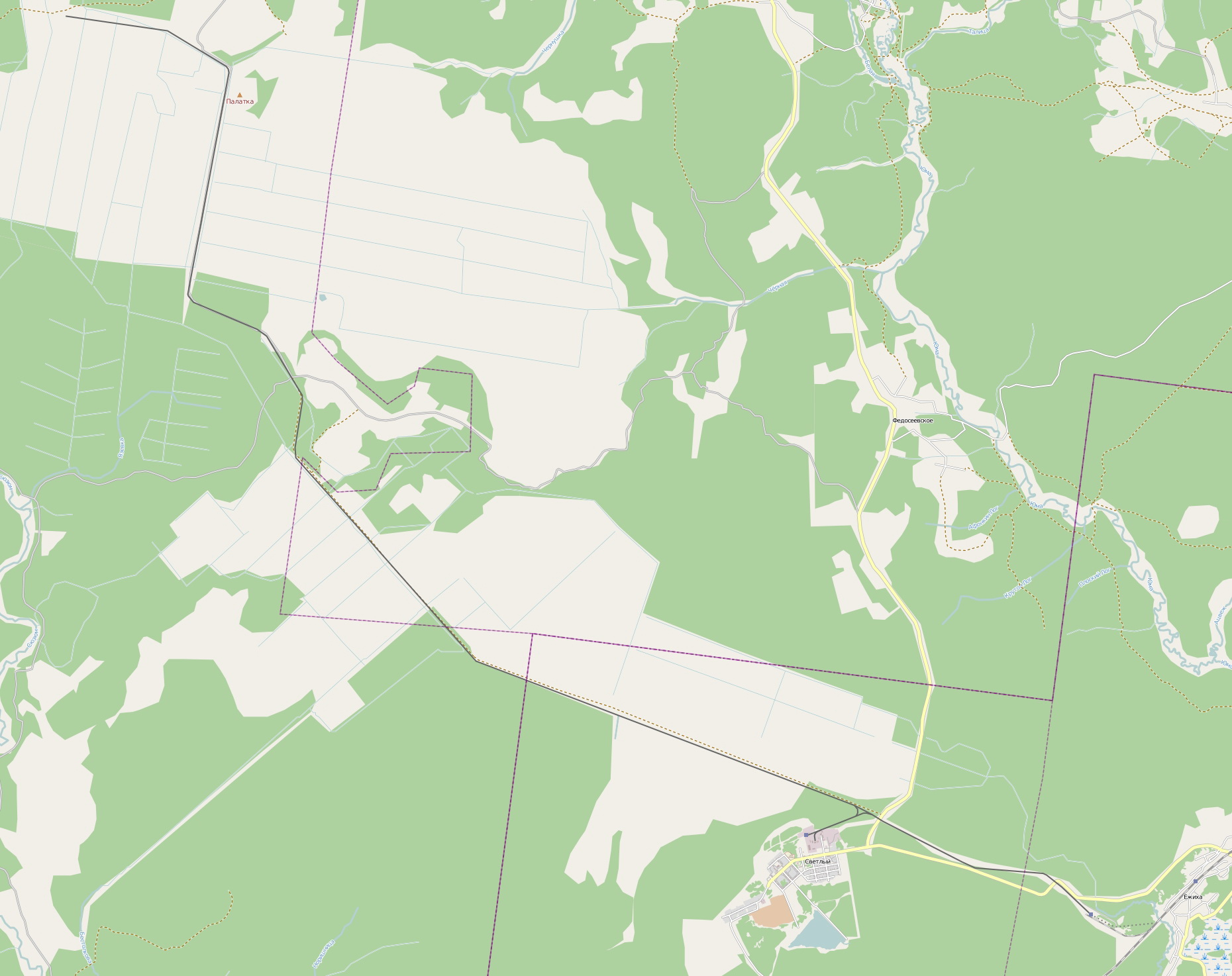

Overview
- Locale: Kirov Oblast, Russia
- Termini: Svetlyi
- Website: www.vyatkatorf.ru

Service
- Type: Narrow-gauge railway
- Operator: ЗАО «ВяткаТорф»

History
- Opened: 1964

Technical
- Line length: 32 kilometres (20 mi)
- Track gauge: 750 mm (2 ft 5 1/2 in)

The Otvorskoye peat railway is located in Kirov Oblast, Russia. The peat railway was opened in 1964 and has a total length of which 32 kilometres (20 mi) is currently operational; the track gauge is 750 mm (2 ft 5 1/2 in).

== Current status ==
Otvorskoye peat railway emerged in the 1964s, in the area Kotelnichsky District, in a settlement named Svetlyi. The railway was built for hauling peat and carrying workers to and from the peat extraction. Peat is transshipped on broad-gauge 1,520 mm (4 ft 11 27/32 in) rail line and taken to Kirov, Sharyu, to a combined heat and power (CHP) station.

== Rolling stock ==
=== Locomotives ===
- TU4 – № 1335, 1387, 2187, 2188, 2923
- TU6D – № 0201
- ESU2A – № 436

=== Railroad car ===
- Boxcar
- Flatcar
- Tank car
- Snowplow
- Crane (railroad)
- Tank car – fire train
- Passenger car (rail)
- Track laying cranes
- Open wagon for peat
- Hopper car to transport track ballast

== See also ==
- Narrow-gauge railways in Russia
- Gorokhovskoye peat railway
- Pishchalskoye peat railway
- Dymnoye peat railway
