= Kobrinskaya narrow-gauge railway =

Railway in Kirov Oblast, Russia

Coordinates: 59.5171089°N 48.8265548°E

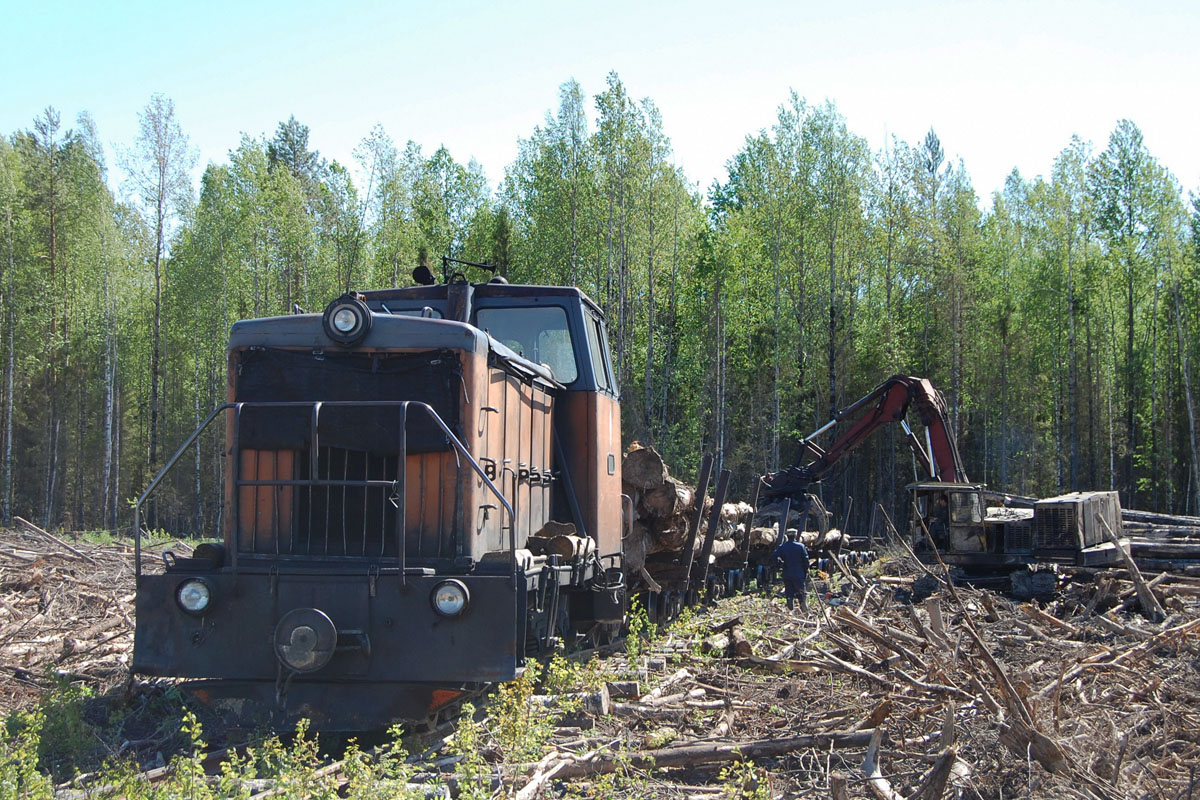

Overview
- Locale: Kirov Oblast, Russia
- Termini: Bezbozhnik
- Website: www.mayskles.ucoz.ru

Service
- Type: Narrow-gauge railway
- Operator(s): JSC «Mayskles»

History
- Opened: 1946

Technical
- Line length: 80 kilometres (50 mi)
- Track gauge: 750 mm (2 ft 5 1/2 in)
Route map
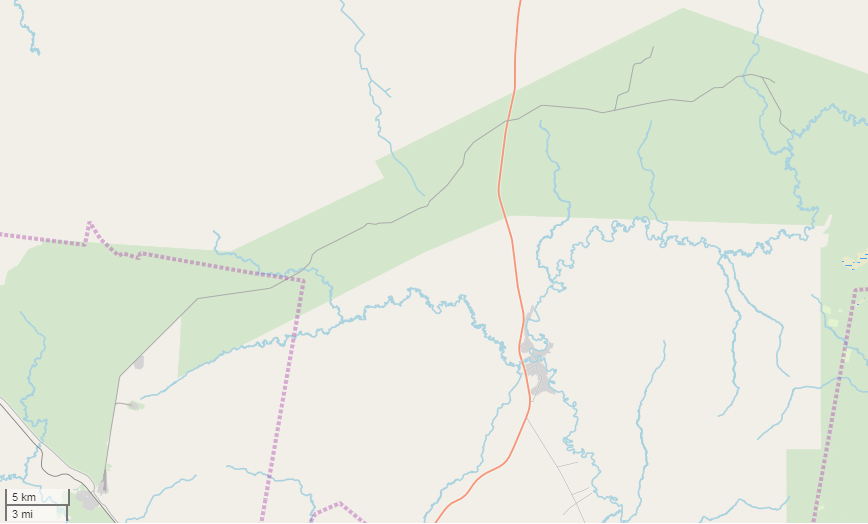

The Kobrinskaya narrow-gauge railway is located in Kirov Oblast, Russia. The forest railway was opened in 1946, has a total length of 80 kilometres (50 mi) and is operational as of 2014, the track gauge is 750 mm (2 ft 5 1/2 in) and operates year-round.

== Current status ==
The Kobrinskaya forestry railway's first line was constructed in 1946, in the area of Murashinsky District, Kirov Oblast from the village Bezbozhnik. The total length of the Kobrinskaya narrow-gauge railway at the peak of its development exceeded 150 kilometres (93 mi), of which 80 kilometres (50 mi) is currently operational. The railway operates scheduled freight services from Bezbozhnik, used for forestry tasks such as the transportation of felled logs and forestry workers. In 1992, as a result of privatization "Mayskiy timber industry enterprise", there was founded JSC "Mayskles" company. In 2014, repairs are being made to the track.

== Rolling stock ==
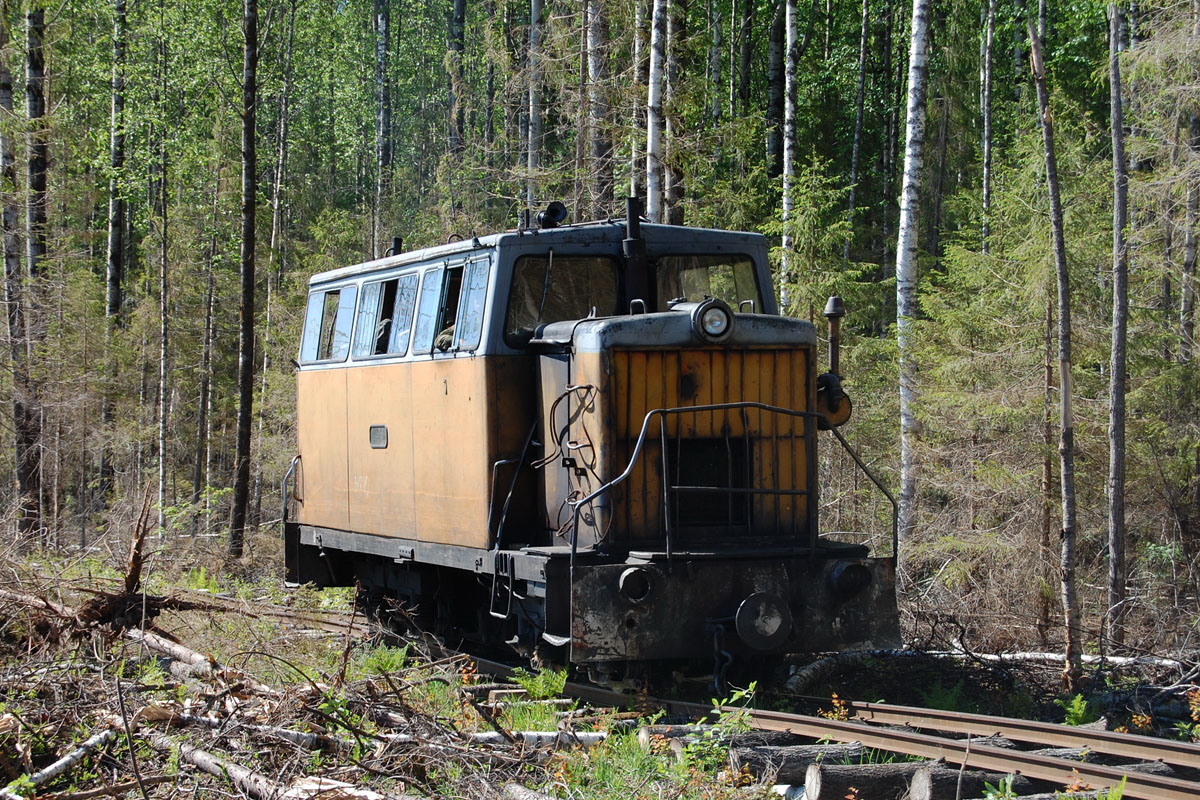
Locomotive TU6P-0022

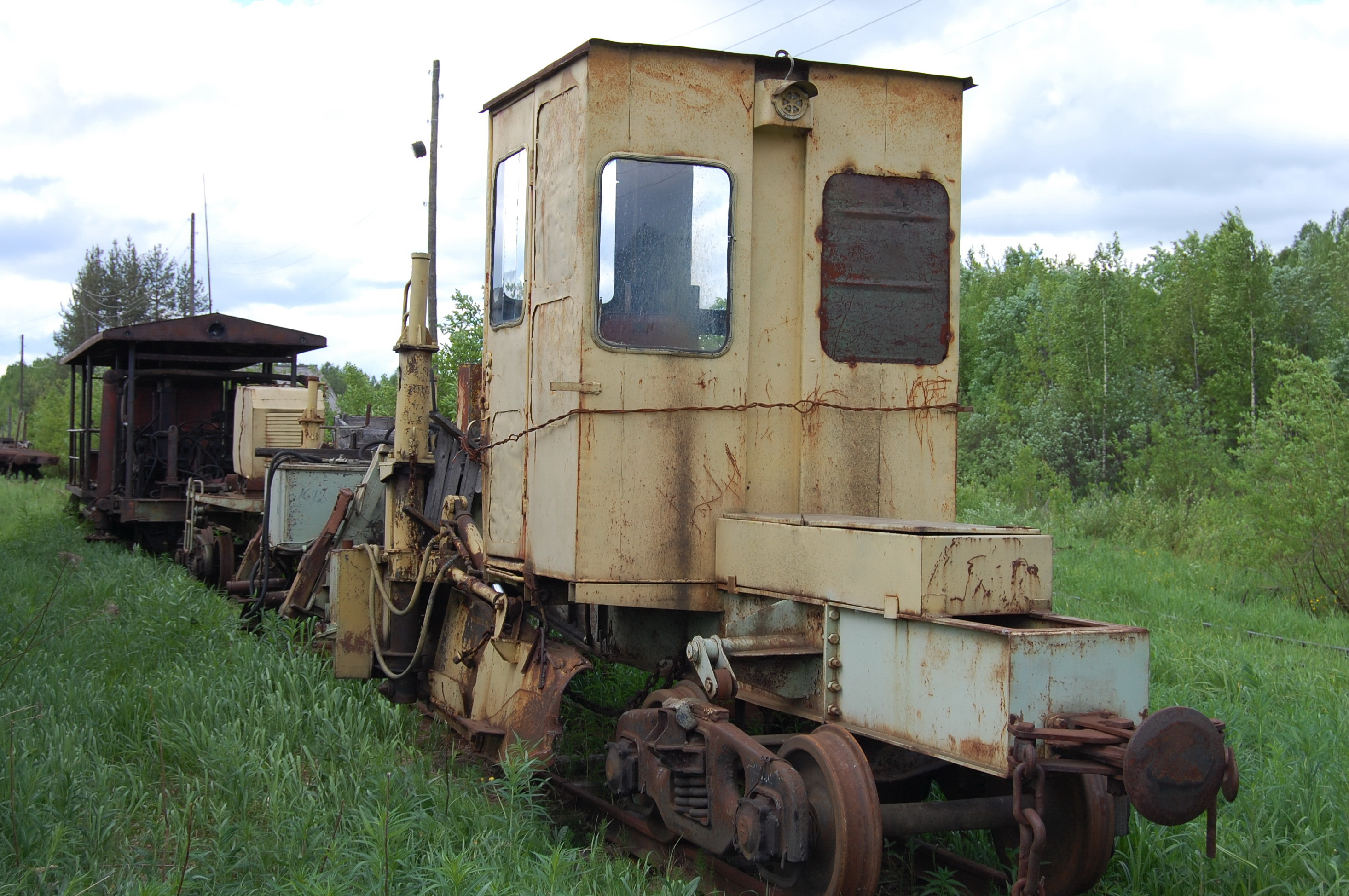
Tamping machine LD-22-002 and Track machine DM-7

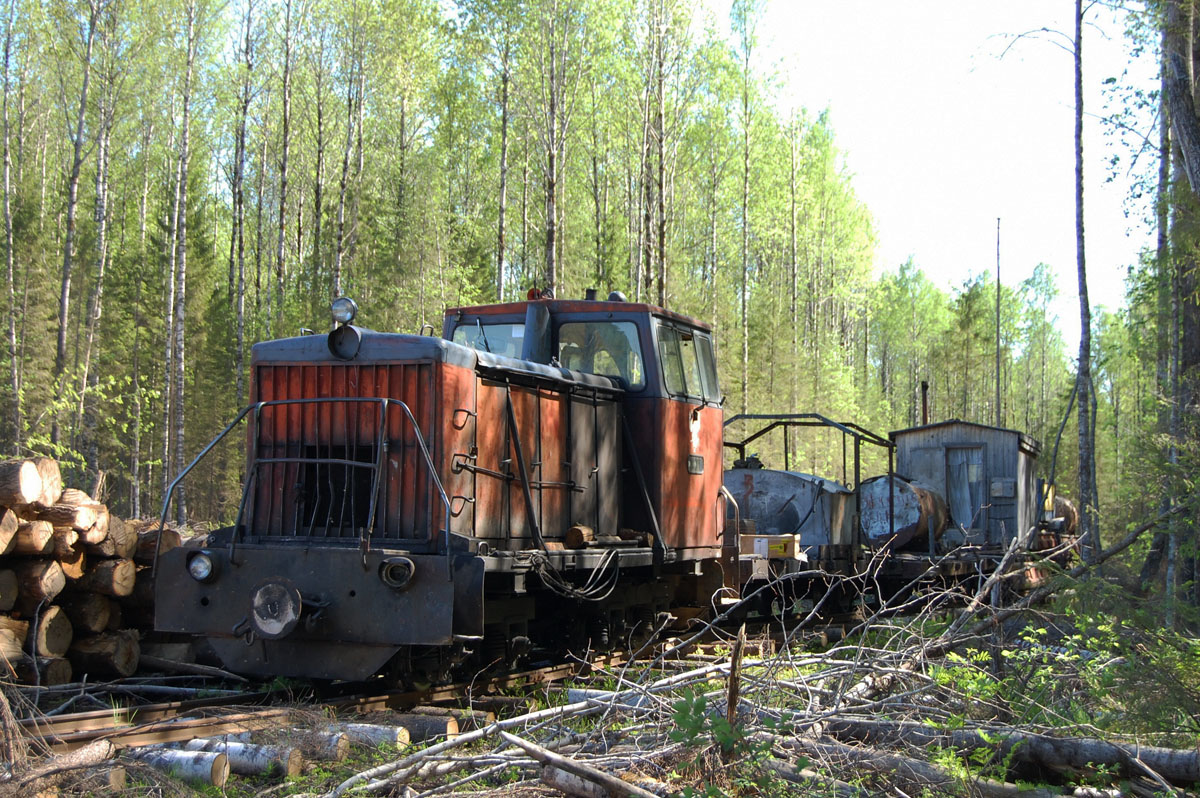
Locomotive TU6A-2846

=== Locomotives ===
- TU4 – No. 0045, 2145
- TU6A – No. 3806, 2846, 2333, 2633, 3697, 3722, 3901, 3082, 3995, 3278, 3490
- TU7 – No. 2787, 2039, 2208, 2569, 2072, 2534
- TU6SPA – No. 0024
- TU6P – No. 0022
- TU8 – No. 0457
- TD-5U "Pioneer"

=== Railroad cars ===
- Boxcar
- Tank car
- Snowplow
- Dining car
- Passenger car
- DM-20 "Fiskars"
- Side-tipping wagons
- Crane LT-110 – No. 018
- Railway log-car and flatcar
- Hopper car to transport track ballast

=== Work trains ===
- Track machine DM-7
- Tamping machine LD-22-002
- Track UPS-1

== Gallery ==
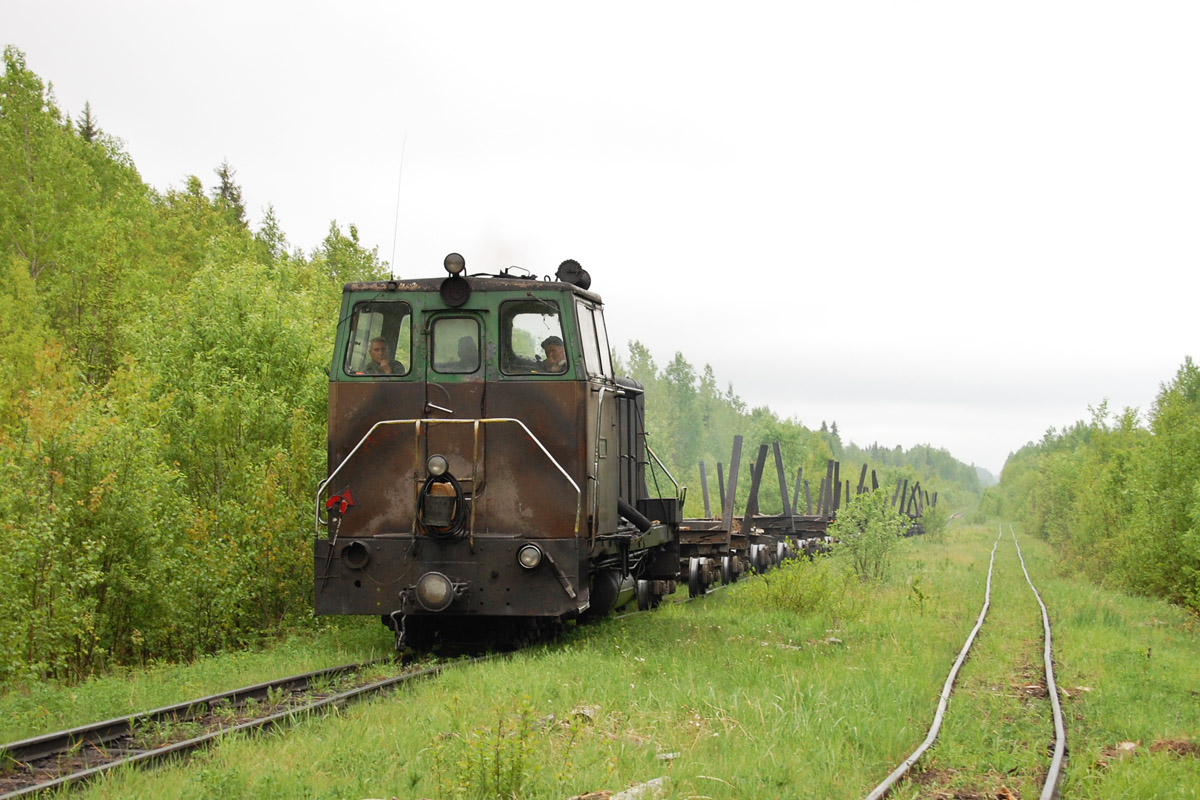
Locomotive TU7-2072 with freight train

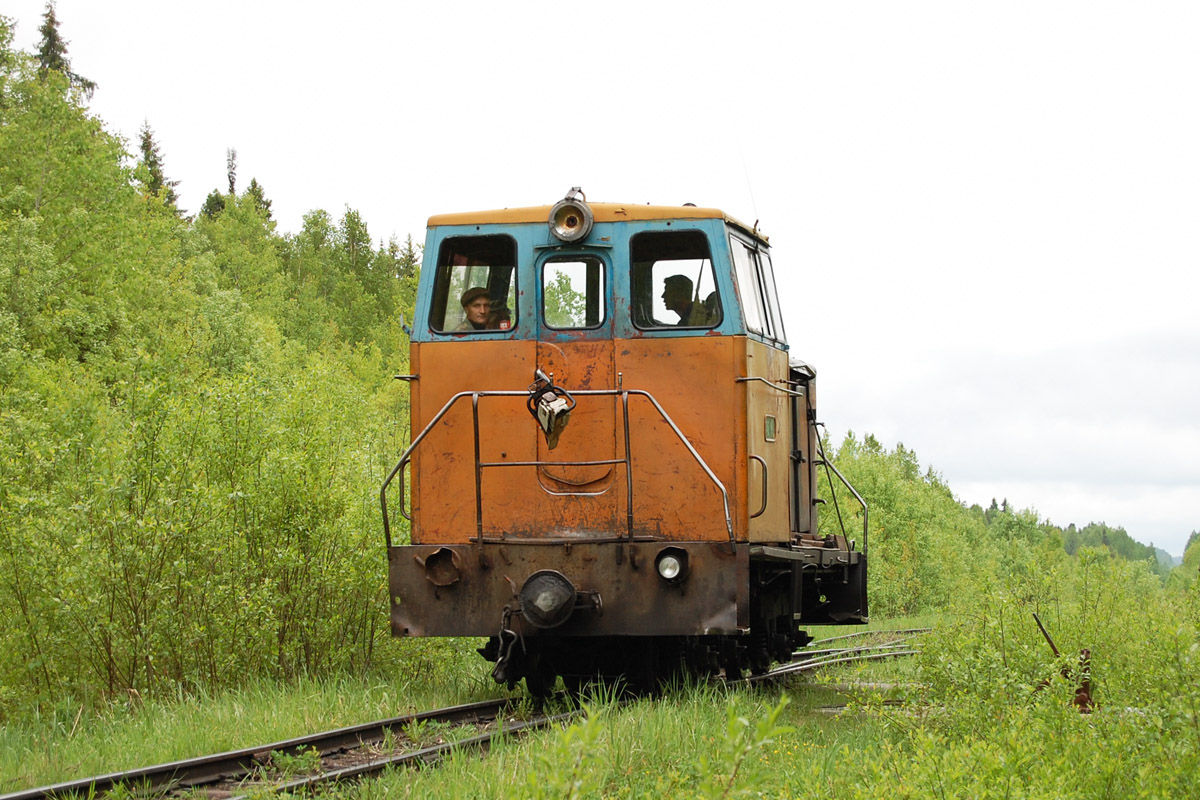
Locomotive TU6A-3695

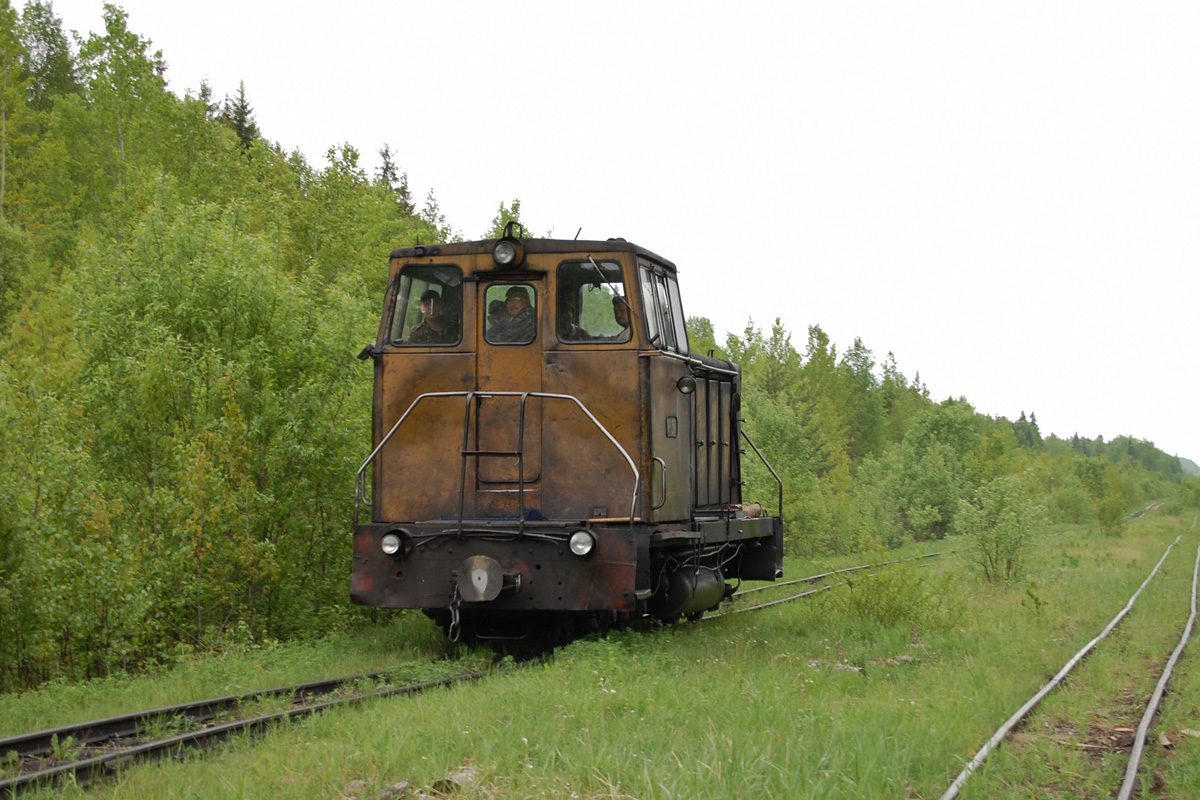
Locomotive TU7-2569

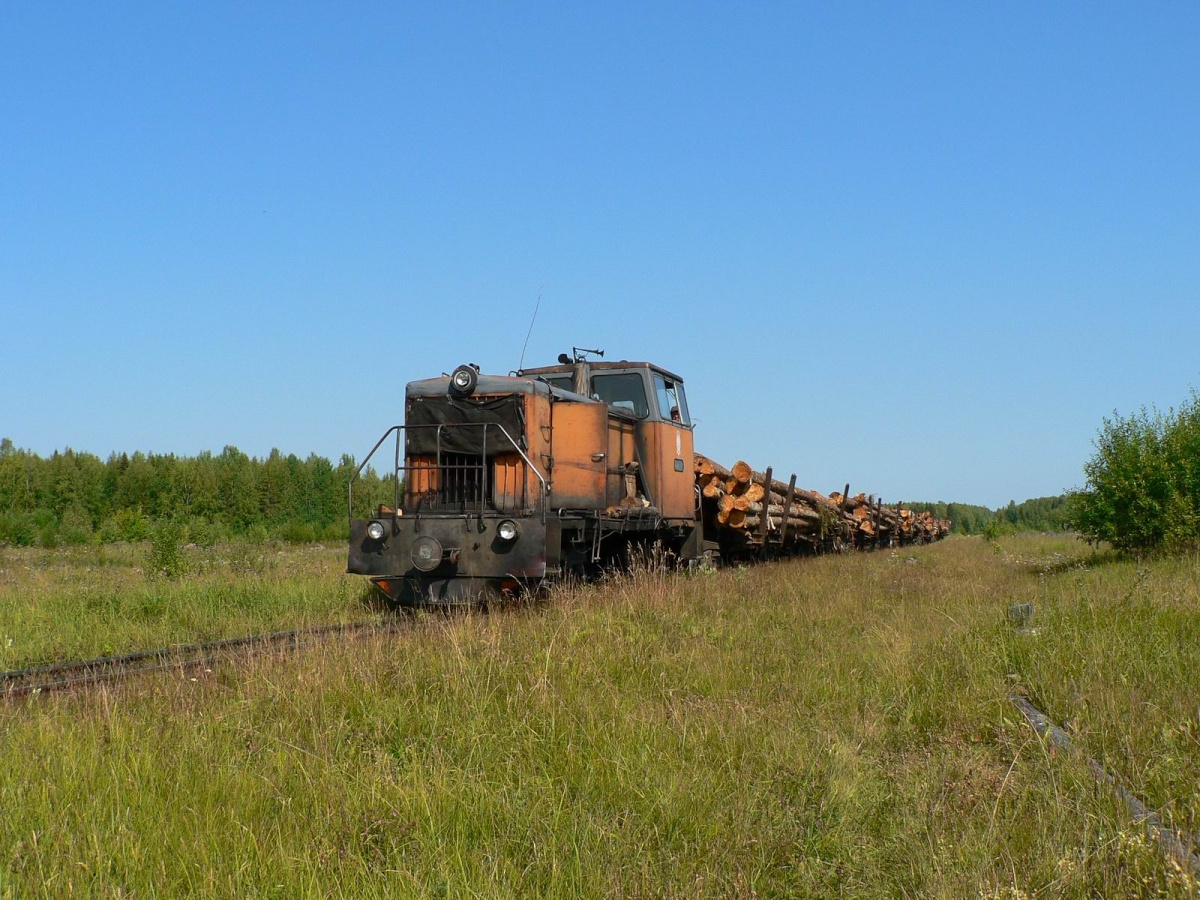
Locomotive TU6A-3809 with freight train

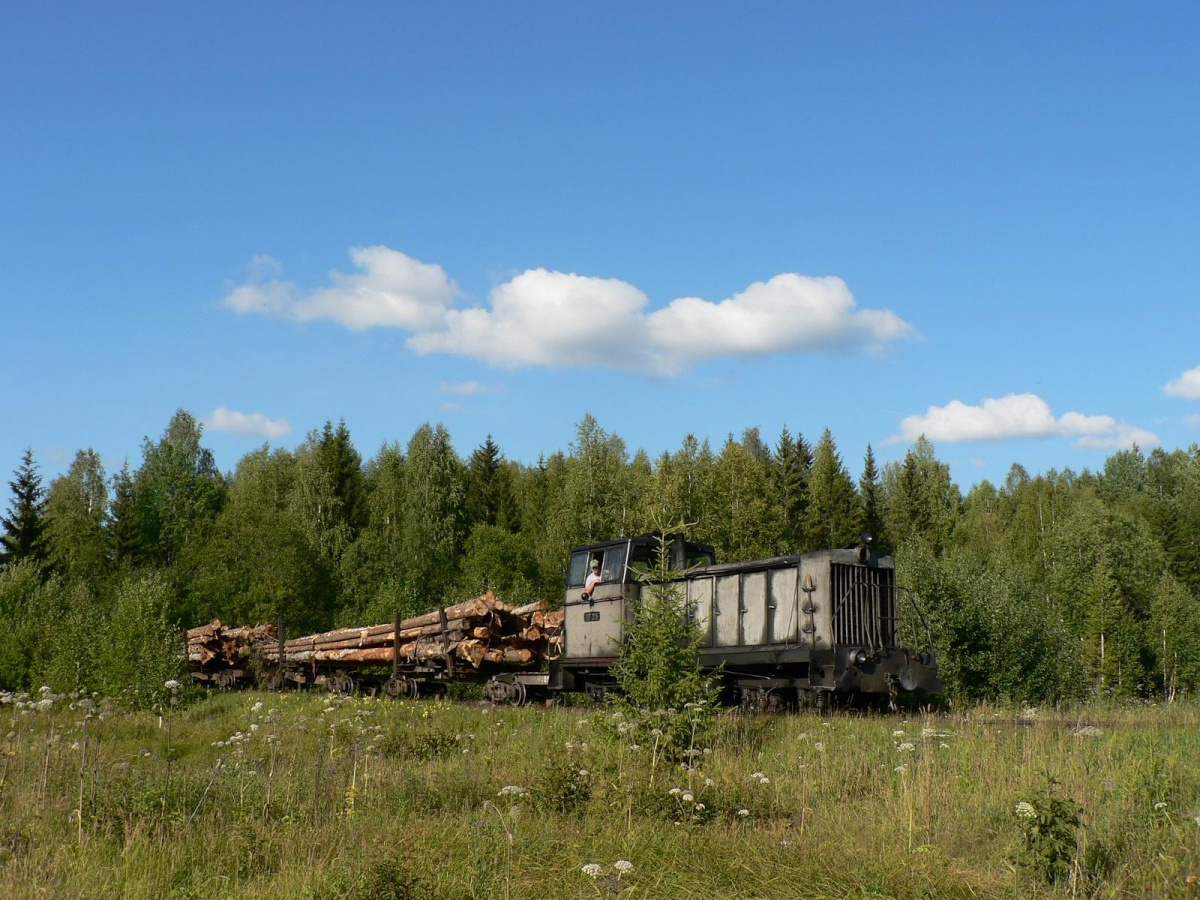
Locomotive TU7-2039 with freight train

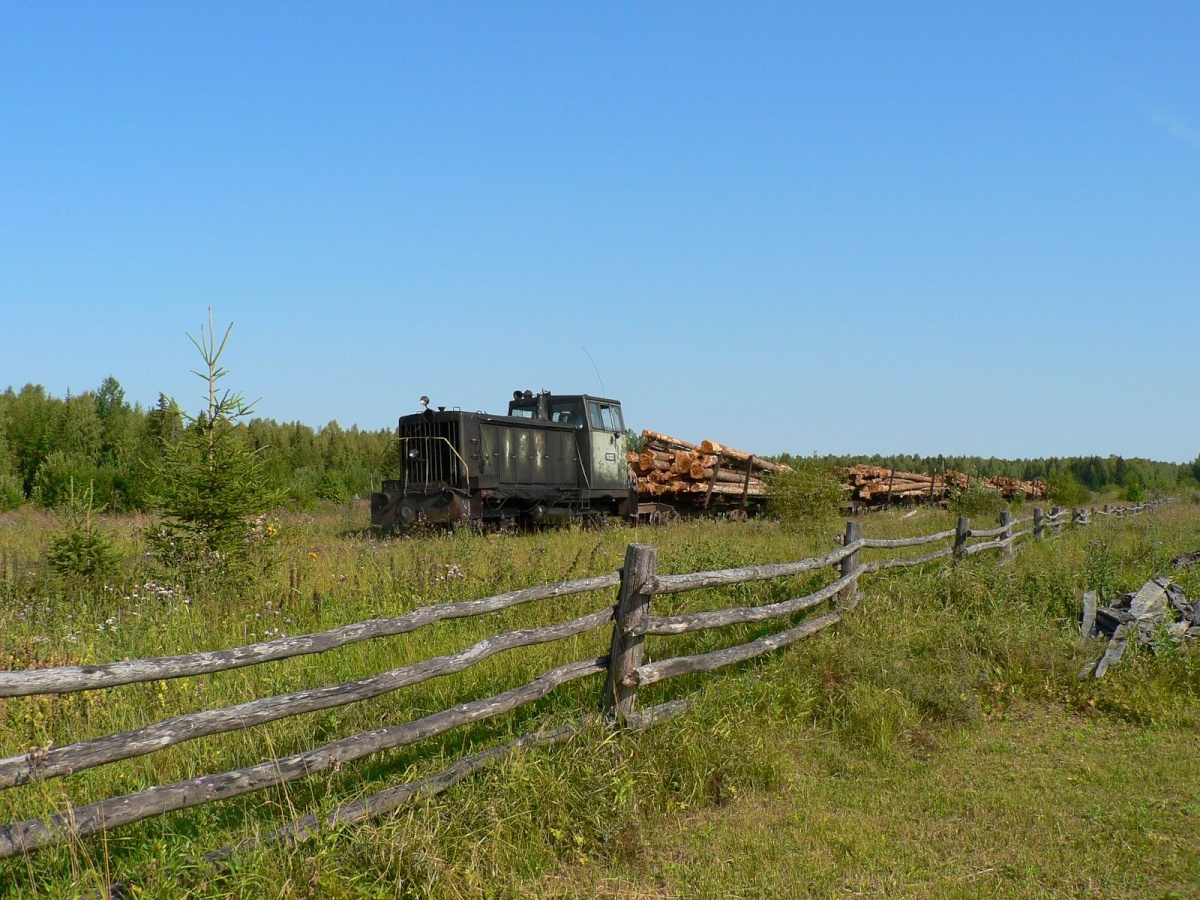
Locomotive TU7-2072 with freight train

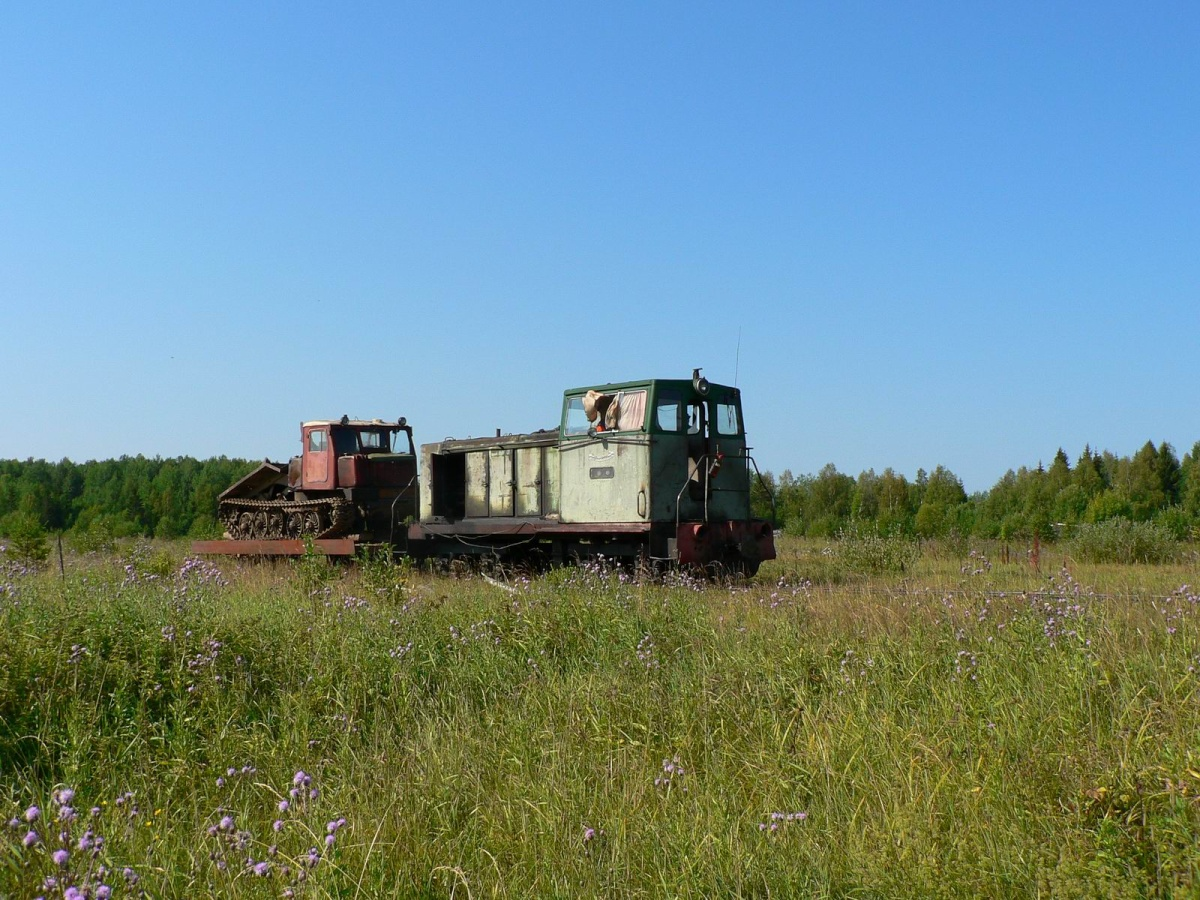
Locomotive TU8-0457 and TT-4 Skidder

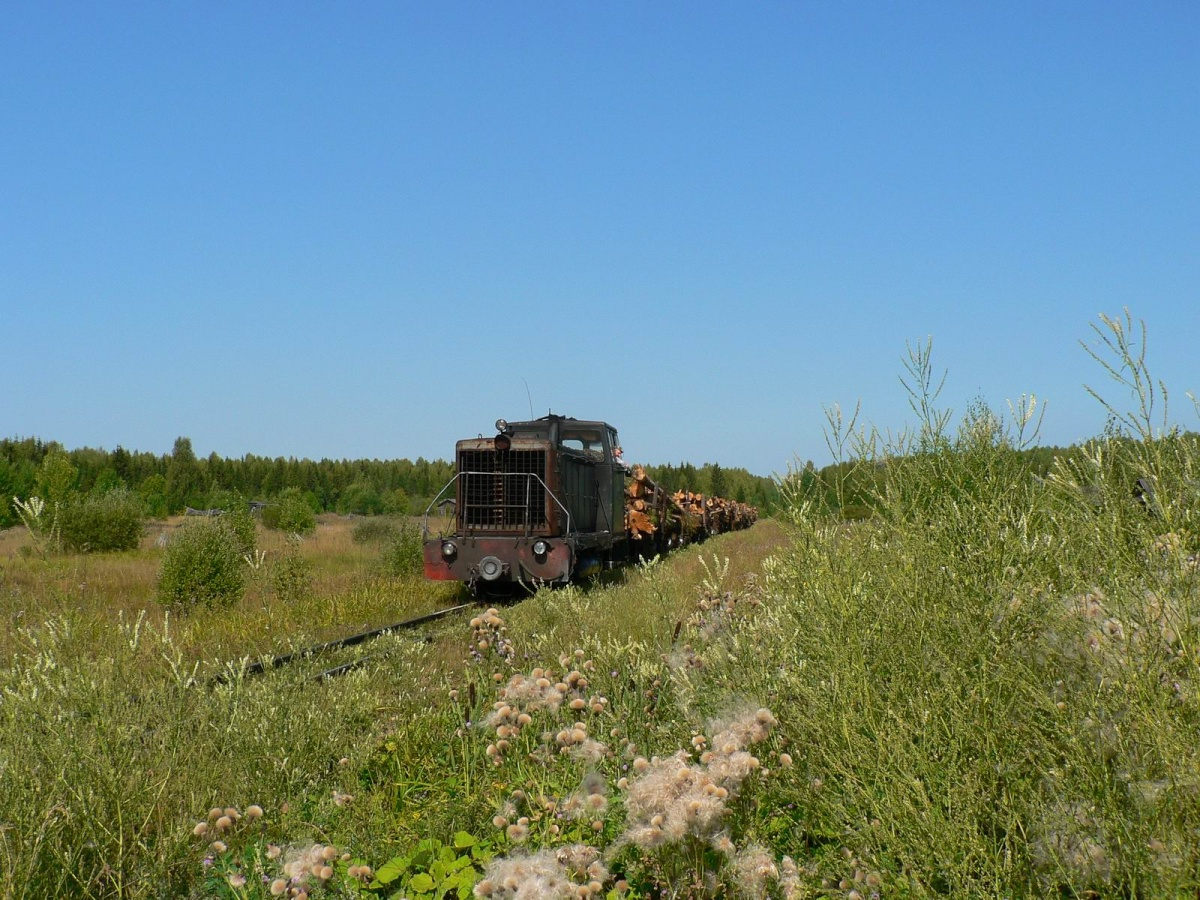
Locomotive TU7A-2787 with freight train

== See also ==
- Narrow-gauge railways in Russia
- List of Russian narrow-gauge railways rolling stock
