= Gorokhovskoye peat railway =

Railway line in Kirov Oblast, Russia

Coordinates: 58.17906°N 48.01180°E

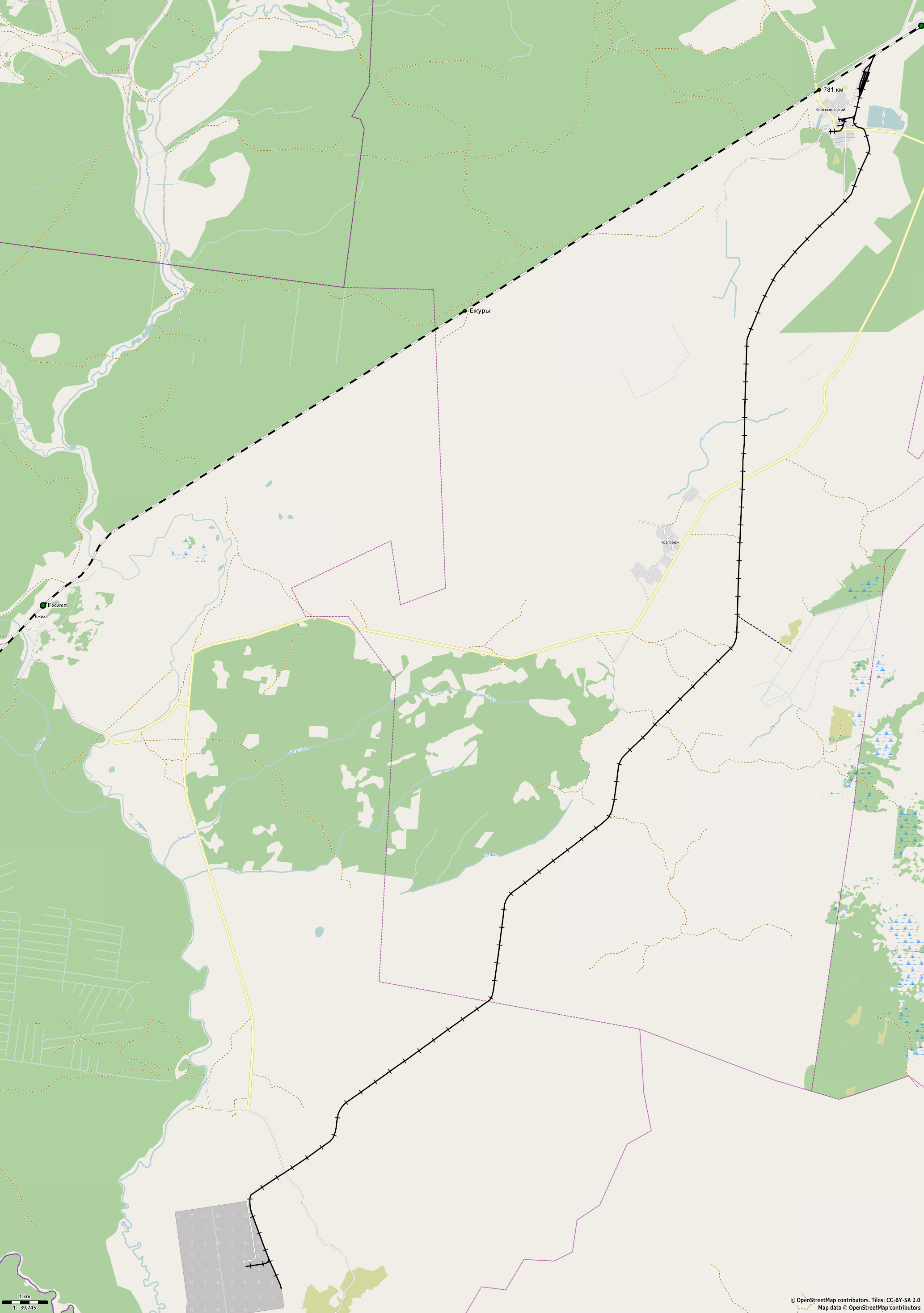

Overview
- Locale: Kirov Oblast, Russia
- Termini: Komsomol
- Website: www.vyatkatorf.ru

Service
- Type: Narrow-gauge railway
- Operator(s): ЗАО «ВяткаТорф»

History
- Opened: 1960

Technical
- Line length: 35 kilometres (22 mi)
- Track gauge: 750 mm (2 ft 5 1/2 in)
Route map
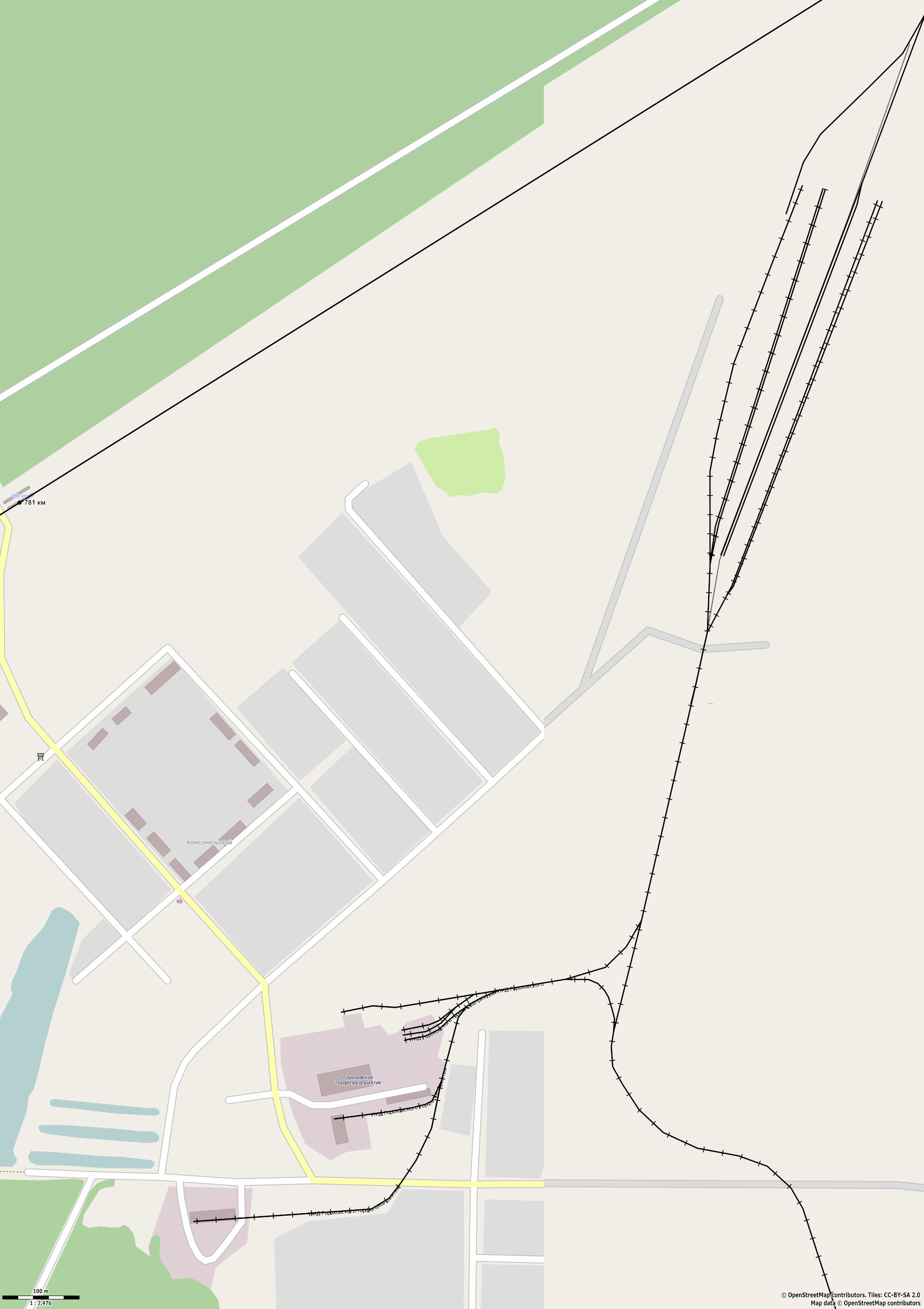

The Gorokhovskoye peat railway is located in Kirov Oblast, Russia. The peat railway was opened in 1960, and has a total length of which 35 kilometres (22 mi) is currently operational; the track gauge is 750 mm (2 ft 5 1/2 in).

== Current status ==
Gorokhovskoye peat railway emerged in the 1960s, in the area Kotelnichsky District, in a settlement named Komsomolthe. The peat railway was built for hauling peat and workers and operates year-round. Operations consist of peat and passenger transport. Peat is transshipped on broad gauge 1,520 mm (4 ft 11 27/32 in) rail line and taken to Kirov to a combined heat and power (CHP) power station.

== Rolling stock ==
=== Locomotives ===
- TU4 – № 818, 1323, 2961, 2594
- ESU2A – № 848, 927

=== Railroad car ===
- Boxcar
- Flatcar
- Tank car
- Snowplow
- Tank car – fire train
- Passenger car
- Open wagon for peat
- Hopper car to transport track ballast

=== Work trains ===
- Crane GK-5
- Track UPS-1- № 50
- Track laying cranes PPR2ma

== Gallery ==
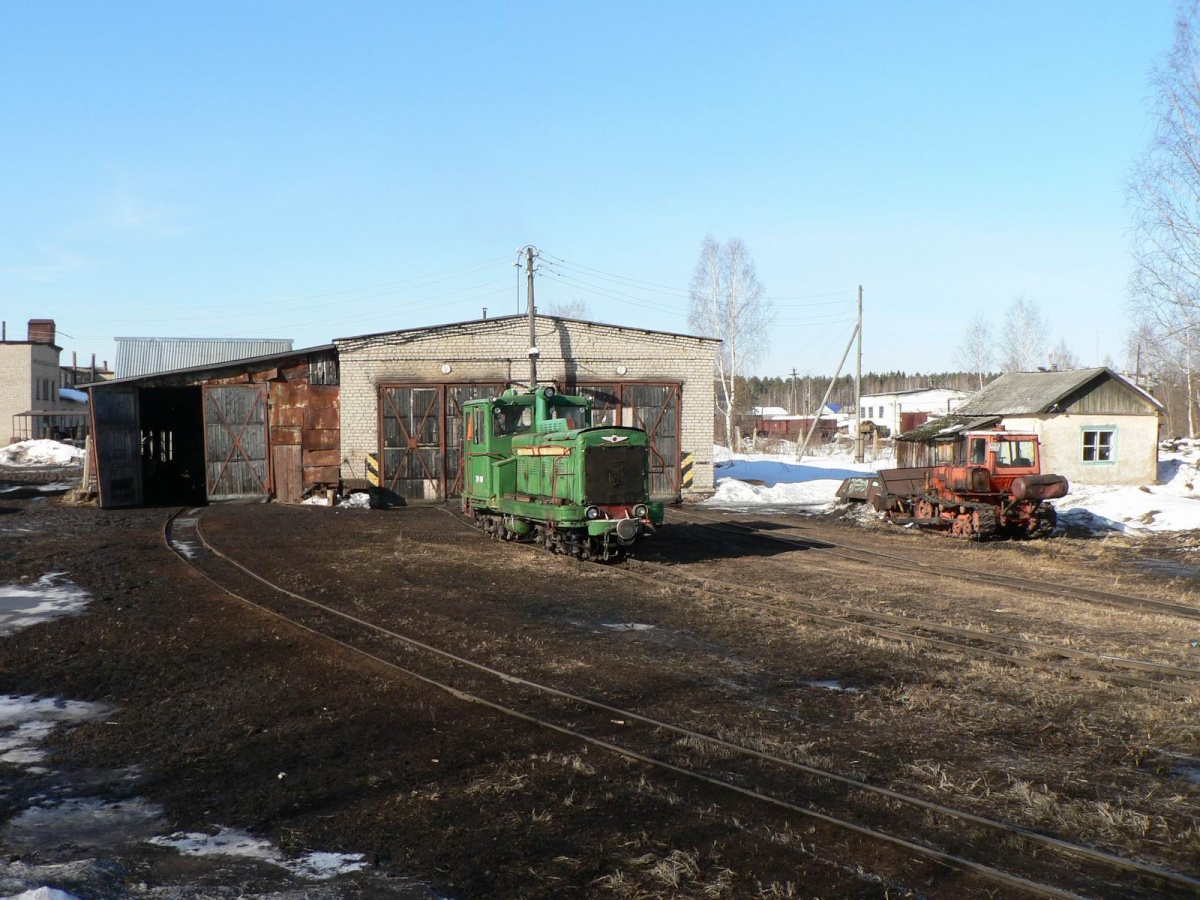
Locomotive TU4-818

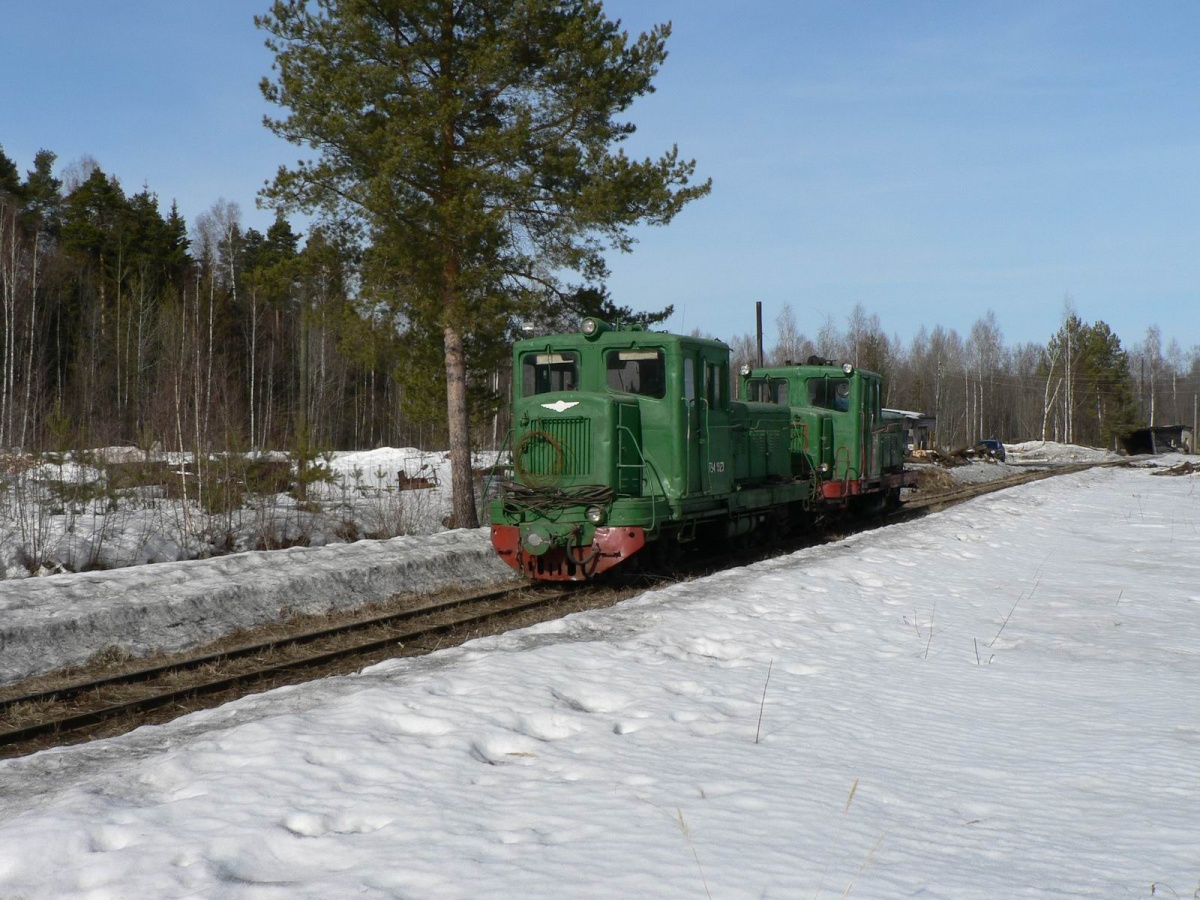
Locomotives TU4-818 and TU4-2961

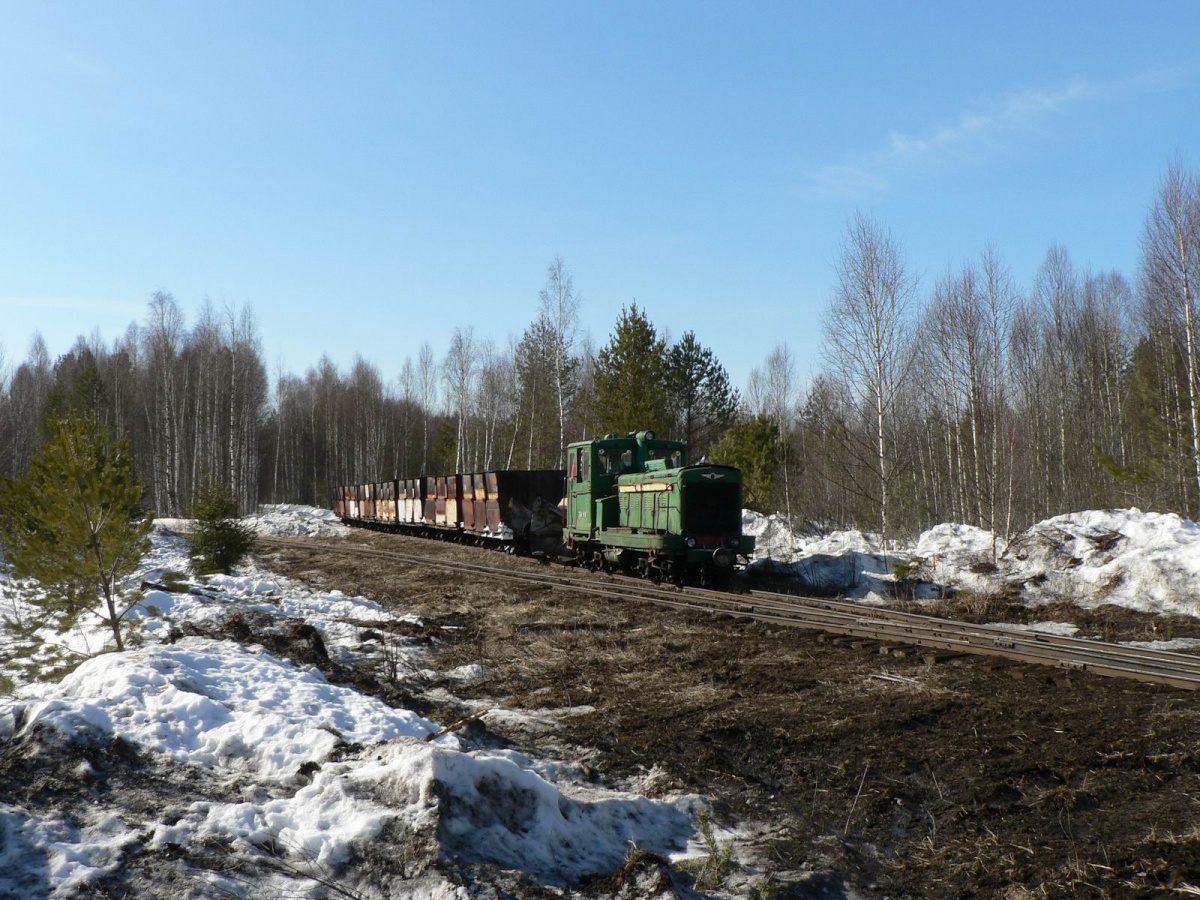
Locomotive TU4-818 with freight train

== See also ==
- Narrow-gauge railways in Russia
- Dymnoye peat railway
- Otvorskoye peat railway
- Pishchalskoye peat railway
