= Kirov Oblast =

Administrative division of Russia

Kirov Oblast Кировская область (Russian)
- Oblast
- Flag Coat of arms

- Coordinates: 58°46′N 49°50′E
- Country: Russia
- Federal district: Volga
- Economic region: Volga-Vyatka
- Established: 5 December 1936
- Administrative centre: Kirov

Government
  - Body: Legislative Assembly
  - Governor: Aleksandr Sokolov

Area
  - Total: 120,374 km^{2} (46,477 sq mi)
  - Rank: 30th

Population (2021 census)
  - Total: 1,153,680
  - Estimate (2018): 1,283,238
  - Rank: 41st
  - Density: 9.58413/km^{2} (24.8228/sq mi)
  - Urban: 77.8%
  - Rural: 22.2%

GDP (nominal, 2024)
  - Total: ₽715 billion (US$8.39 billion)
  - Per capita: ₽635,117 (US$7,452.59)
- Time zone: UTC+3 (MSK)
- ISO 3166 code: RU-KIR
- License plates: 43
- OKTMO ID: 33000000
- Official languages: Russian
- Website: http://www.kirovreg.ru

Kirov Oblast (Note: Russian: Кировская область, romanized: Kírovskaya óblast', IPA: [ˈkʲirəfskəjə ˈobləsʲtʲ]) is a federal subject of Russia (an oblast) located in Eastern Europe. Its administrative centre is the city of Kirov. As of the 2021 census, the population is 1,153,680.

== Geography ==
The oblast is bordered by Vologda, Arkhangelsk, Kostroma and Nizhny Novgorod Oblasts, as well as by the republics of Komi, Mari El, Tatarstan, and Udmurtia, and Perm Krai. Animals living in the oblast include bears, beavers, squirrels, moose, wolves, etc.

=== Natural resources ===
Natural resources include forests (mostly conifers), phosphate rock, peat, furs, water and land. There are widespread deposits of peat and non-metallic minerals: limestone, marl, clay, sand and gravel, as well as the rare mineral volkonskoite.

In recent decades, a minor recoverable oil reserve was revealed in the east of the region, as well as deposits of bentonite clays. The region also contains the Vyatsko-Kama deposit of phosphate rock, the largest in Europe. Rich in mineral springs, the Kumyonsky District contains the resort town of Nizhneivkino.

=== Hydrography ===
Kirov Oblast is characterized by diverse hydrography, including numerous rivers, lakes, and reservoirs which play an essential role in its geography, economy, and ecology. The hydrographic network of Kirov Oblast is dominated by the Volga River basin, one of the largest river systems in Europe, but additionally encompasses the Severodvinsk.

The rivers in Kirov Oblast are numerous, with more than 19,000 rivers and streams, and spanning 66.7 kilometres. Some of the most significant rivers include the Vyatka, Moloma, Cheptsa, and Kama rivers. The region contains approximately 4,500 lakes, many of which are of glacial origin, with a combined water surface area of 5.5 million hectares. These lakes provide habitats for various species of fish and birds and are often used for recreational purposes. The rivers and lakes of Kirov Oblast are integral to the region's natural environment and economy, providing water for agriculture, supporting fisheries, and transportation.

== History ==
In the late 19th and early 20th centuries, Vyatka remained a place of exile for opponents of the Russian Empire, including many prominent revolutionary figures. In 1920, a number of small southern and eastern districts (volosti) and villages were shifted from Vyatka as a result of the formation of the Tatar Autonomous Soviet Socialist Republic and the Mari and Votskaya (now the Udmurt Republic) autonomous regions.

The territory did not escape the Russian Civil War and intervention of 1918–1921. Then between 1921 and 1922, it was hit by famine, followed by a typhus epidemic in late 1922. The death rate doubled during those years. The postwar period was accompanied by rebuilding of the province on the basis of the New Economic Policy (NEP), which consisted of free trade, entrepreneurship, and private sector stimulation.

The country's first office of the International Organization for Aid to Fighters of the Revolution (IOAR) began operations here in January 1923.

The administrative and territorial reforms of 1929 eliminated the old division of the country into provinces and districts (Uezd, Volost) and introduced a new system of division into regions, territories, and districts (raiony). Vyatka Province was abolished, and its territory became part of Nizhny Novgorod Oblast. The city of Vyatka became a district centre.

On 5 December 1934, the Presidium of the All-Russian Central Executive Committee (VTsIK) passed a resolution renaming the city from Vyatka to Kirov, and Kirov Oblast was formed on 7 December. It included the Udmurt Autonomous Region, 37 districts (raiony) of Gorki Region (which had formerly been part of Vyatka Province), as well as Sapapulsky and Votkinsky districts of Sverdlovsk Region. Following the adoption of the new Constitution in 1936, Kirov Territory was transformed into Kirov Region and the Udmurt Autonomous Soviet Socialist Republic (ASSR) was separated from it.

On 30 October 1997, Kirov, alongside Astrakhan, Murmansk, Ulyanovsk, and Yaroslavl, signed a power-sharing agreement with the government of Russia, granting it autonomy. The agreement would be abolished on 24 January 2002.

== Administrative divisions ==
Kirov Oblast was formed on 7 December 1934. It is divided administratively into 39 districts, 6 cities under oblast jurisdiction, 13 town under district jurisdiction, 58 urban-type settlements, and 580 selsoviets.

== Economy ==
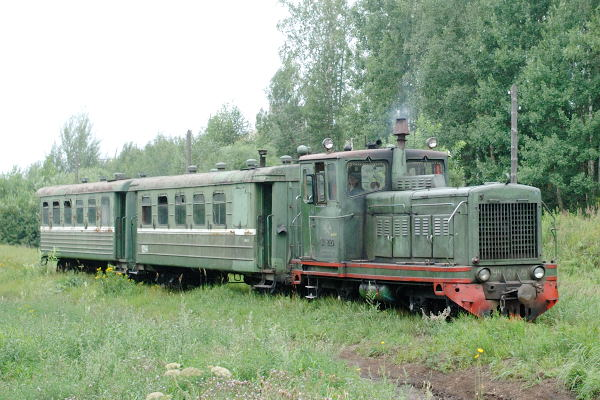
Pishchalskoye peat railway

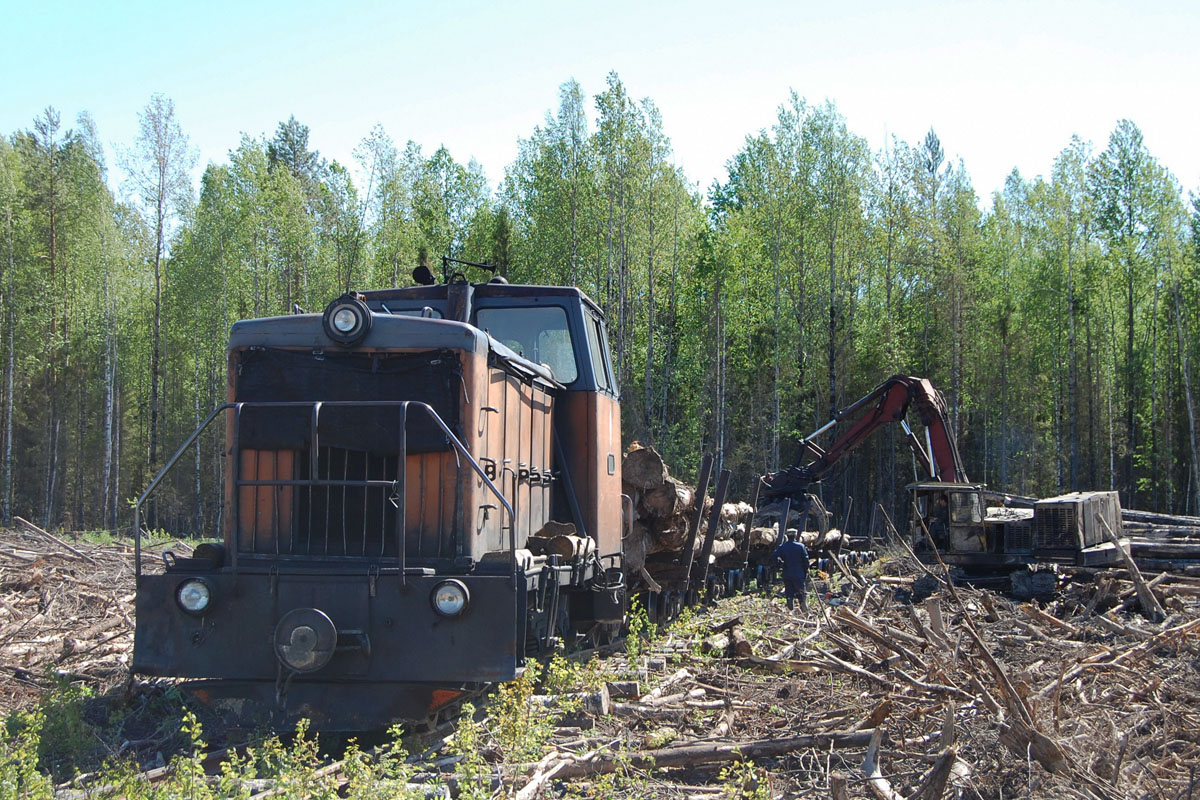
Kobrinskaya railway

Kirov Oblast is part of the Volga–Vyatka economic district located in the central part of European Russia in the Volga and Vyatka river basins. Its economic complex had already begun forming and developing before the Revolution, in large part because of the transfer points and trading posts located in Vyatka, which later led to the formation of large railway. Trading Centers Agriculture was the priority sector at first, but starting in 1940, there was an upsurge in development of an industrial complex, especially the engineering, metalworking, and chemical industries.

Kirov Oblast is part of the Volga–Vyatka agricultural zone, where more than half of the area sown in grain is located in Kirov Oblast itself. Agricultural land occupies 27% of the region's territory. The most important grain crops are winter and spring wheat and rye. Barley and oats are grown for fodder. Increased specialization in the production of more promising fodder crops like winter rye, barley, oats that are most suited to the Oblast's climatic conditions is anticipated in the future. Potatoes are also extensively cultivated.

=== Transportation ===
- The Dymnoye peat railway operates in Verkhnekamsky District
- The Gorokhovskoye peat railway operates in Kotelnichsky District
- The Otvorskoye peat railway operates in Kotelnichsky District
- The Pishchalskoye peat railway operates in Orichevsky District
- The Kobrinskaya narrow-gauge railway for hauling felled logs operates in Murashinsky District
- The Oparinskaya narrow-gauge railway for hauling felled logs operates in Oparinsky District

=== Petroleum infrastructure ===
The Kirov Oblast is the site of the Rosrezerves' Zenit oil depot in Kotelnich, a large petroleum tank farm installation of the Russian State Reserve.

== Politics ==
During the Soviet period, the high authority in the oblast was shared between three persons: The first secretary of the Kirov CPSU Committee (who in reality had the biggest authority), the chairman of the oblast Soviet (legislative power), and the Chairman of the oblast Executive Committee (executive power). Since 1991, CPSU lost all the power, and the head of the Oblast administration, and eventually the governor was appointed/elected alongside elected regional parliament.

The Charter of Kirov Oblast is the fundamental law of the region. The Legislative Assembly of Kirov Oblast is the province's standing legislative (representative) body. The Legislative Assembly exercises its authority by passing laws, resolutions, and other legal acts and by supervising the implementation and observance of the laws and other legal acts passed by it. The highest executive body is the Oblast Government, which includes territorial executive bodies such as district administrations, committees, and commissions that facilitate development and run the day to day matters of the province. The Oblast administration supports the activities of the Governor who is the highest official and acts as guarantor of the observance of the oblast Charter in accordance with the Constitution of Russia.

== Demographics ==
Population: 1,153,680 (2021 census); 1,341,312 (2010 census); 1,503,529 (2002 census); 1,692,655 (1989 Soviet census).

=== Settlements ===
Largest cities or towns in Kirov Oblast 2010 Russian census
Rank		Administrative Division	Pop.
1	Kirov	City of oblast significance of Kirov	473,695
2	Kirovo-Chepetsk	Town of oblast significance of Kirovo-Chepetsk	80,921
3	Vyatskiye Polyany	Town of oblast significance of Vyatskiye Polyany	35,162
4	Slobodskoy	Town of oblast significance of Slobodskoy	33,981
5	Kotelnich	Town of oblast significance of Kotelnich	24,979
6	Omutninsk	Omutninsky District	23,615
7	Yaransk	Yaransky District	17,253
8	Sovetsk	Sovetsky District	16,598
9	Sosnovka	Vyatskopolyansky District	11,960
10	Luza	Luzsky District	11,260

Vital statistics for 2024:

Historical population
Year	Pop.	±%
1897	3,030,831	—
1939	2,226,000	−26.6%
1959	1,913,600	−14.0%
1970	1,727,348	−9.7%
1979	1,661,546	−3.8%
1989	1,692,655	+1.9%
2002	1,503,529	−11.2%
2010	1,341,312	−10.8%
2021	1,153,680	−14.0%
Source: Census data

- Births: 7,912 (7.0 per 1,000)
- Deaths: 18,131 (16.1 per 1,000)

Total fertility rate (2024):
1.43 children per woman

Life expectancy (2021):
Total — 69.73 years (male — 64.80, female — 74.68)

Ethnic Composition (2010):

- Russians – 91.9%
- Tatars – 2.8%
- Mari people – 2.3%
- Udmurts – 1%
- Ukrainians – 0.6%
- Others – 1.4%
- 35,385 people were registered from administrative databases, and could not declare an ethnicity. It is estimated that the proportion of ethnicities in this group is the same as that of the declared group.

=== Religion ===
Religion in Kirov Oblast as of 2012 (Sreda Arena Atlas)
Russian Orthodoxy	40.1%
Other Orthodox	1.3%
Old Believers	1%
Other Christians	5.3%
Islam	0.9%
Spiritual but not religious	32.9%
Atheism and irreligion	13.1%
Other and undeclared	5.4%

According to a 2012 survey, 40.1% of the population of Kirov Oblast adheres to the Russian Orthodox Church, 5% are unaffiliated generic Christians, 1% are Orthodox Christian believers not belonging to churches or members of non-Russian Orthodox churches, 1% are adherents to Islam, 1% to the Old Believers. In addition, 33% of the population deems itself to be "spiritual but not religious", 13% is atheist, and 5.9% follows other religions or did not give an answer to the question.

== See also ==
- List of Chairmen of the Kirov Oblast Duma
