= Kotelnichsky District =

Kotelnichsky District Котельничский район (Russian)
- District
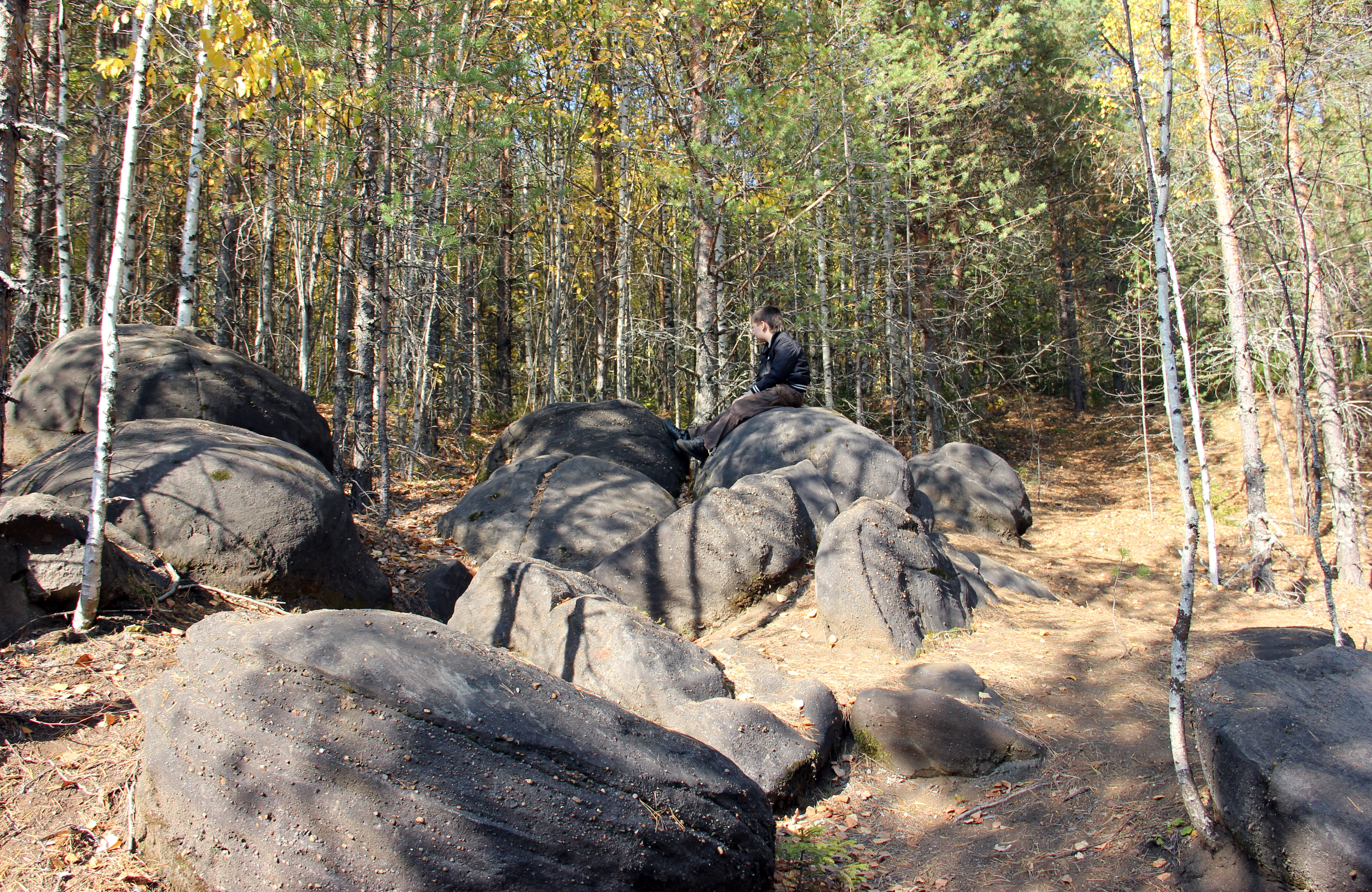
- Geological Concretions ("Relic balls"), Kotelnichsky District

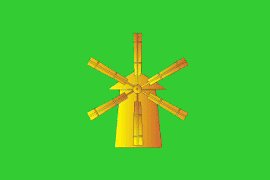
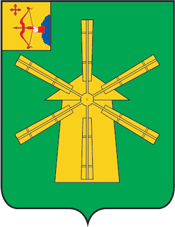
- Flag Coat of arms
- Location of Kotelnichsky District in Kirov Oblast
- Coordinates: 58°18′N 48°20′E
- Country: Russia
- Federal subject: Kirov Oblast
- Established: 15 July 1929
- Administrative center: Kotelnich

Area
  - Total: 3,940 km^{2} (1,520 sq mi)

Population (2010 Census)
  - Total: 15,799
  - Density: 4.01/km^{2} (10.4/sq mi)
  - Urban: 0%
  - Rural: 100%

Administrative structure
  - Administrative divisions: 20 rural okrug
  - Inhabited localities: 250 rural localities

Municipal structure
  - Municipally incorporated as: Kotelnichsky Municipal District
  - Municipal divisions: 0 urban settlements, 20 rural settlements
- Time zone: UTC+3 (MSK)
- OKTMO ID: 33619000
- Website: http://www.kotelnich-msu.ru/

Kotelnichsky District (Russian: Коте́льничский райо́н) is an administrative and municipal district (raion), one of the thirty-nine in Kirov Oblast, Russia. It is located in the west of the oblast. The area of the district is 3,940 square kilometers (1,520 sq mi). Its administrative center is the town of Kotelnich (which is not administratively a part of the district). Population: 15,799; (2010 census) 20,507 (2002 Census); 27,712 (1989 Soviet census).

== Administrative and municipal status ==
Within the framework of administrative divisions, Kotelnichsky District is one of the thirty-nine in the oblast. The town of Kotelnich serves as its administrative center, despite being incorporated separately as an administrative unit with the status equal to that of the districts.

As a municipal division, the district is incorporated as Kotelnichsky Municipal District. The Town of Kotelnich is incorporated separately from the district as Kotelnich Urban Okrug.

== Economy and transportation ==
The Otvorskoye and Gorokhovskoye peat railways for hauling peat operate in the district.
