= Pishchalskoye peat railway =

Railway line in Russia

Coordinates: 58.30443°N 48.63222°E

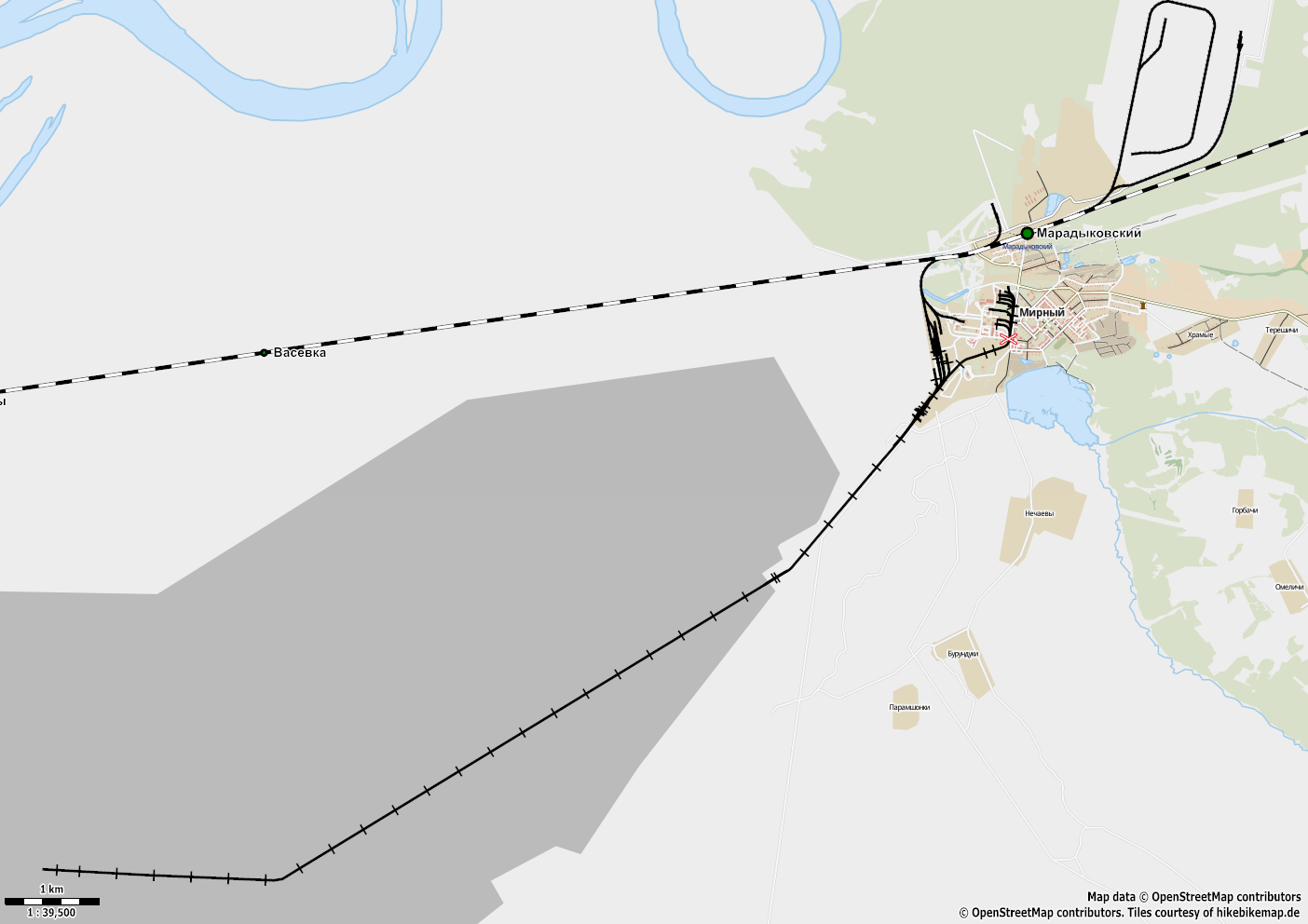

Overview
- Locale: Kirov Oblast, Russia
- Termini: Mirnyi
- Website: www.vyatkatorf.ru

Service
- Type: Narrow-gauge railway
- Operator(s): ЗАО «ВяткаТорф»

History
- Opened: 1963

Technical
- Line length: 35 kilometres (22 mi)
- Track gauge: 750 mm (2 ft 5 1/2 in)
Route map
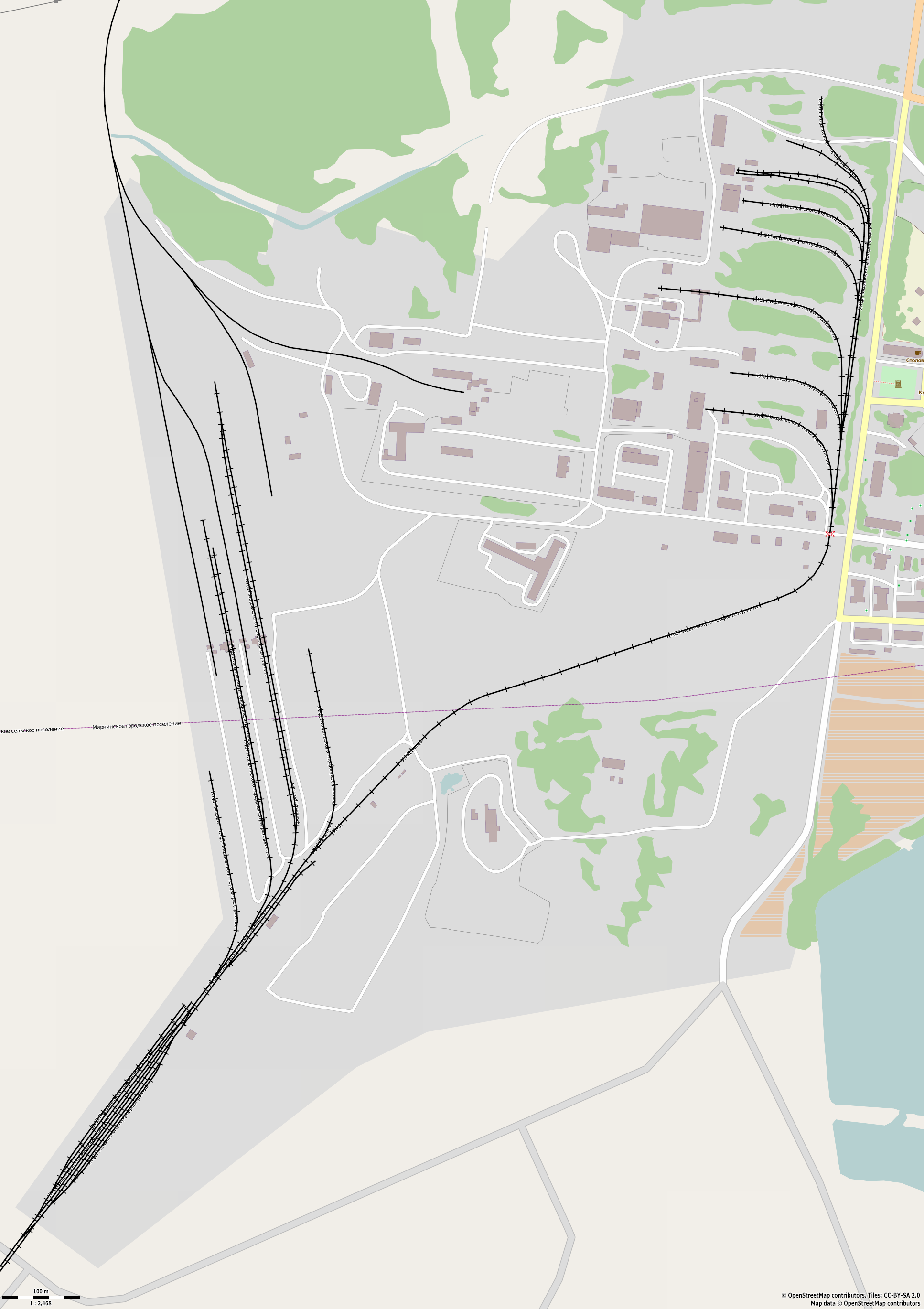

The Pishchalskoye peat railway is located in Kirov Oblast, Russia. The peat railway was opened in 1963 and has a total length of which 35 kilometres (22 mi) is currently operational; the track gauge is 750 mm (2 ft 5 1/2 in).

== Current status ==
Pishchalskoye peat railway emerged in the 1963s, in the area Orichevsky District, in a settlement named Mirnyi. The railway was built for hauling peat and carrying workers to and from the peat extraction. The railway runs 3–4 cargo runs every day from two peat deposits. Peat is transshipped on broad gauge 1,520 mm (4 ft 11 27/32 in) rail line and taken to Kirov, Sharyu to a Combined heat and power (CHP).

== Rolling stock ==
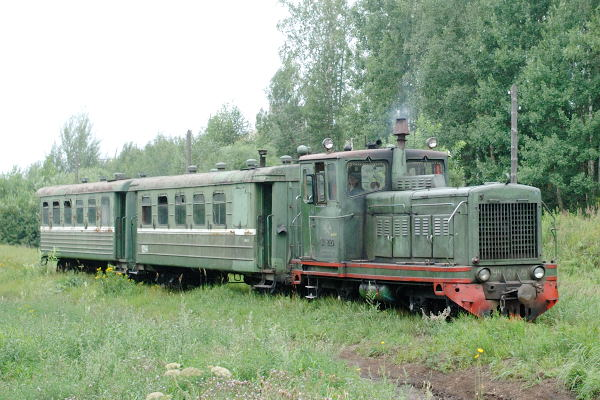
TU4-2129 with passenger train

=== Locomotives ===
- TU4 – № 2170, 2620, 3076, 2129, 2273
- ESU2A – № 786, 434, 921, 102
- TU6A – № 2172
- TU6D – № 0159
- TU8 – № 0426
- PMD3 – № 156, 116 (№ 405)

=== Railroad car ===
- Flatcar
- Tank car
- Snowplow
- Tank car – fire train
- Passenger car
- Open wagon for peat
- Hopper car to transport track ballast

=== Work trains ===
- Crane GK-5
- Track UPS-1- № 31
- Track laying cranes PPR2ma

== Gallery ==
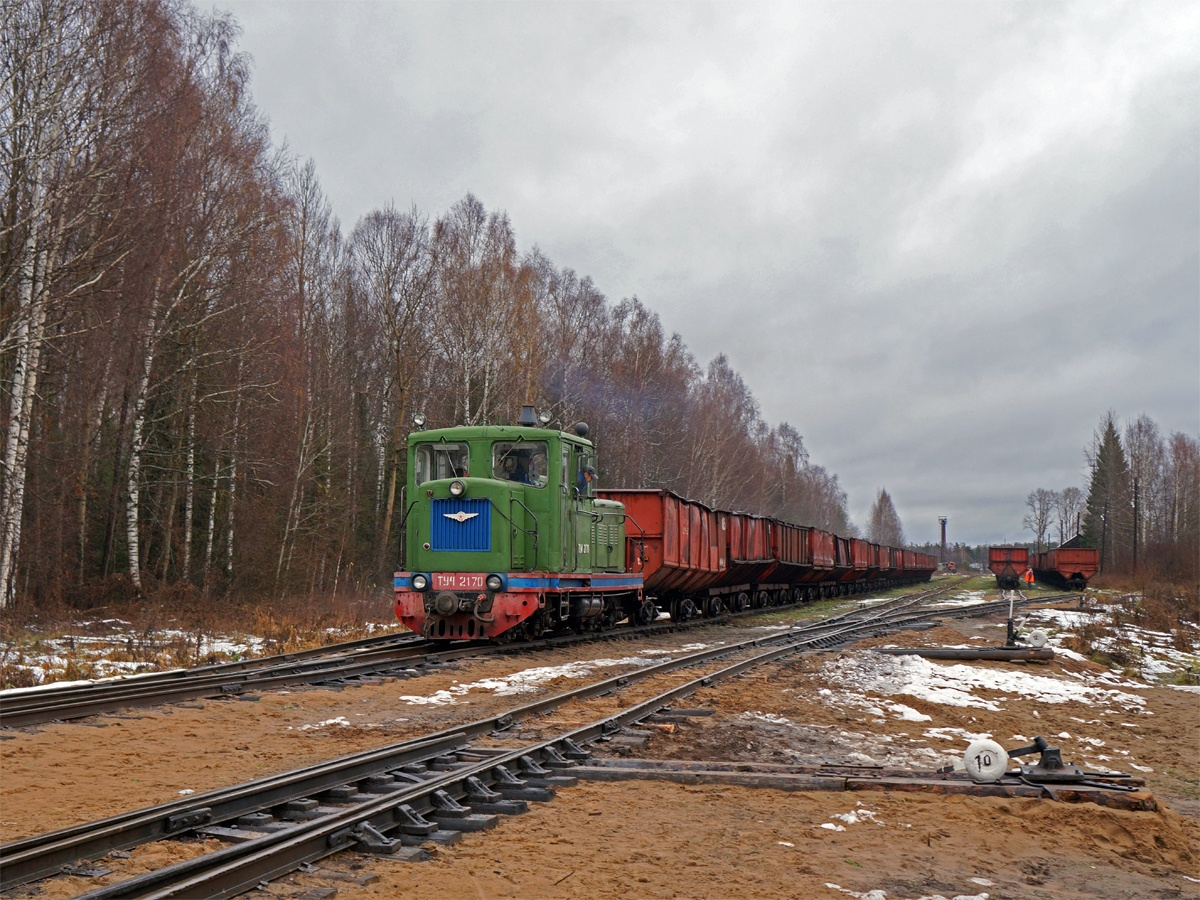
Locomotive TU4-2170 with freight train

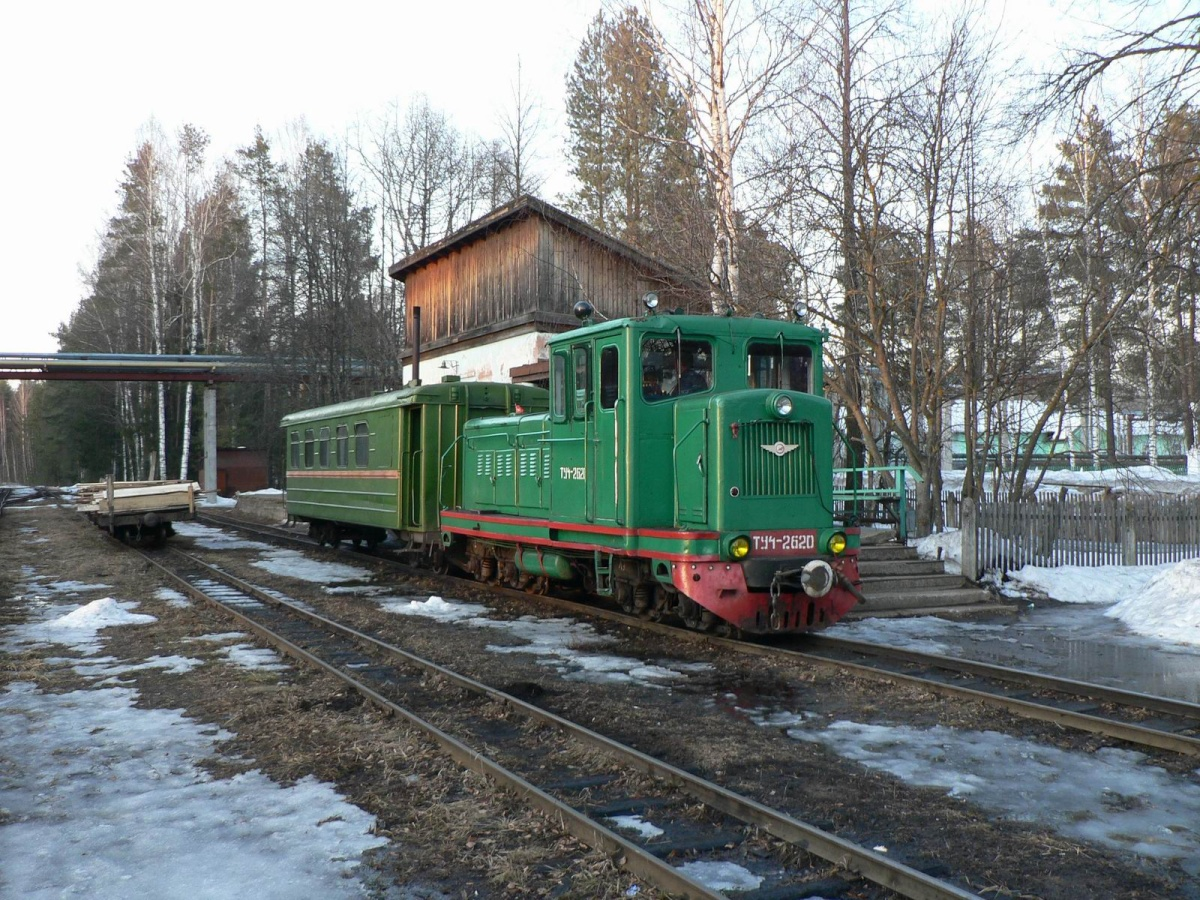
Locomotive TU4-2620 with passenger train

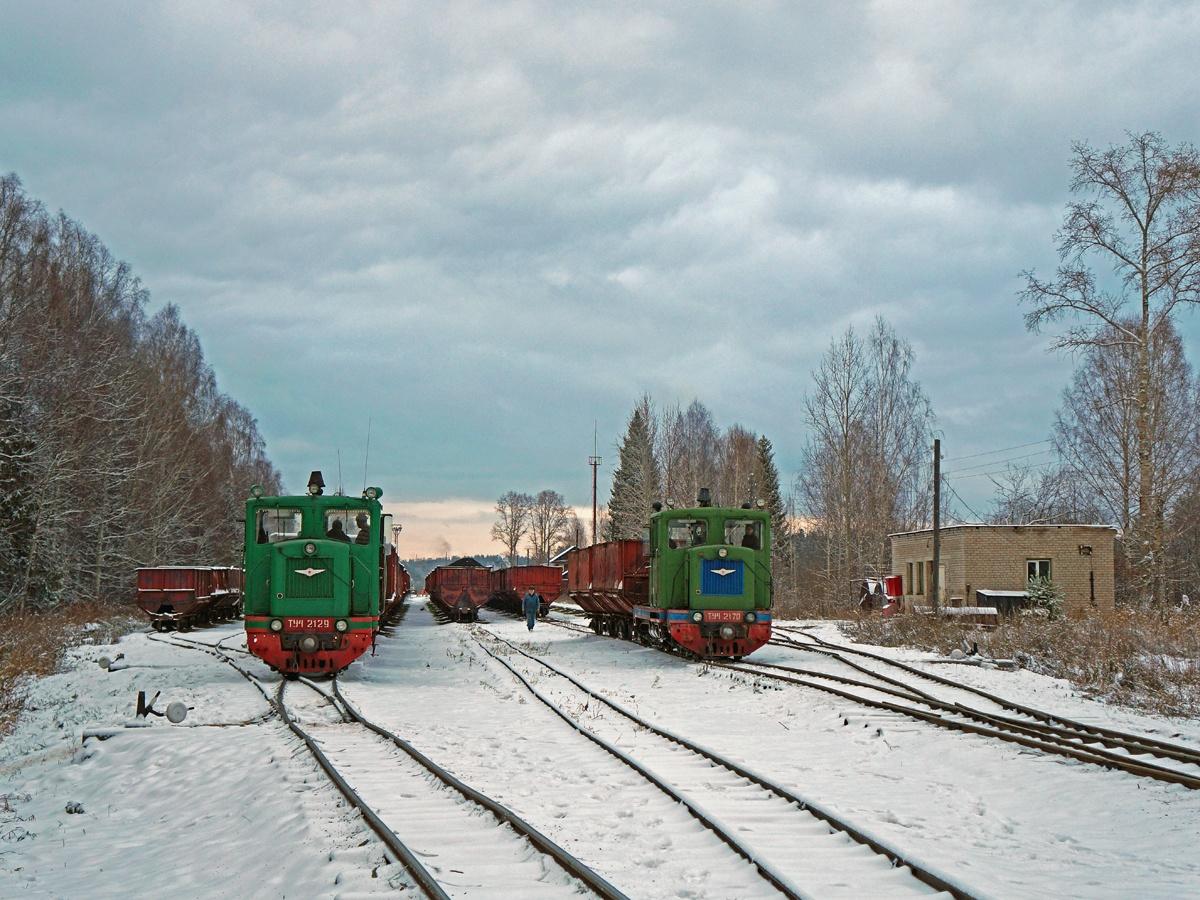
Locomotives TU4-2129 and TU4-2170

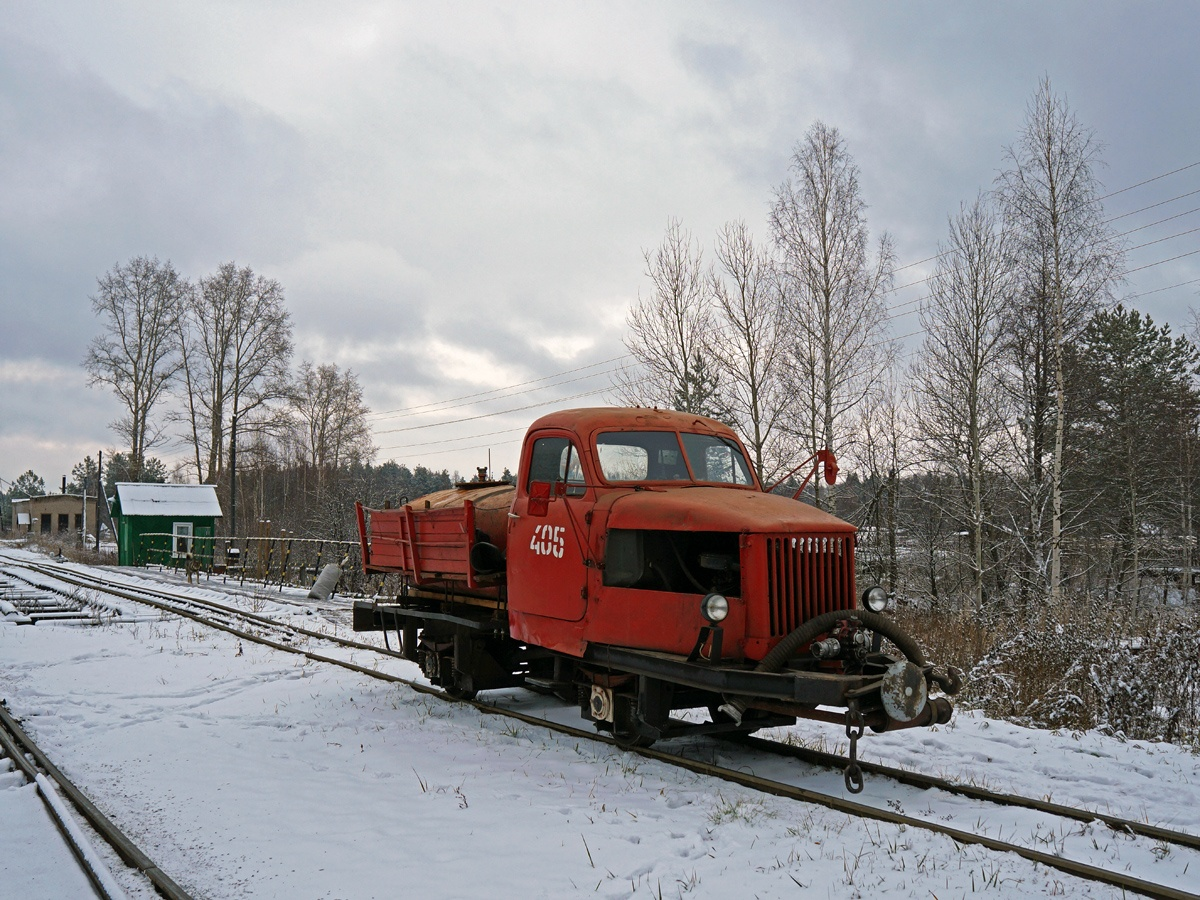
Draisine PMD3-116 (№ 405)

== See also ==
- Narrow-gauge railways in Russia
- Gorokhovskoye peat railway
- Dymnoye peat railway
- Otvorskoye peat railway
