= Dymnoye peat railway =

Coordinates: 59.42065°N 52.37607°E

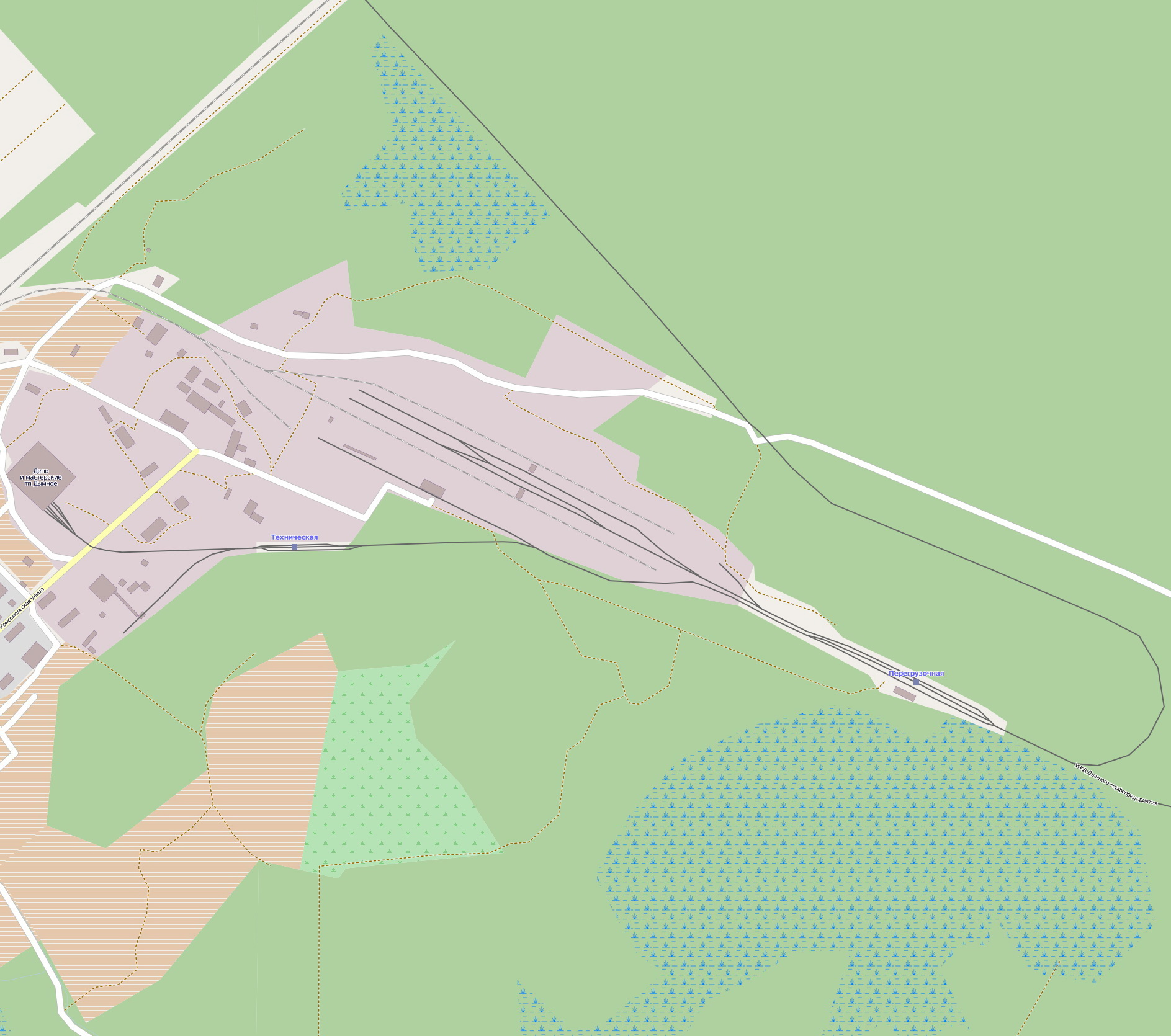

Overview
- Locale: Kirov Oblast, Russia
- Termini: Svetlopolyansk
- Website: www.vyatkatorf.ru

Service
- Type: Narrow-gauge railway
- Operator: ЗАО «ВяткаТорф»

History
- Opened: 1967

Technical
- Line length: 79 kilometres (49 mi)
- Track gauge: 750 mm (2 ft 5 1/2 in)
Route map
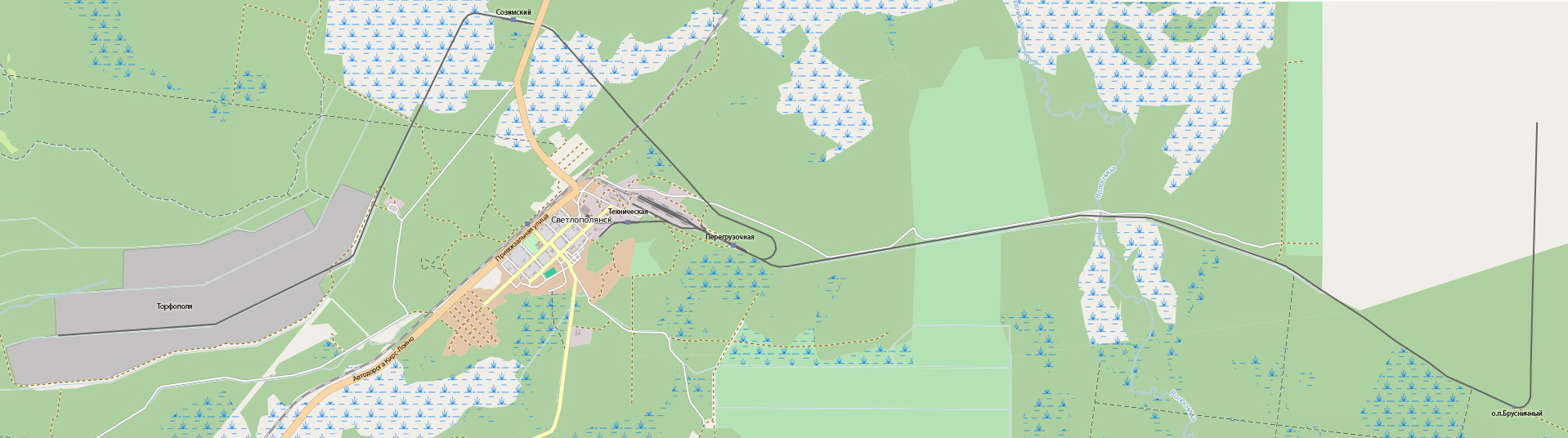

The Dymnoye peat railway is located in Kirov Oblast, Russia. The peat railway was opened in 1967, and has a total length of 79 kilometres (49 mi) is currently operational; the track gauge is 750 mm (2 ft 5 1/2 in).

== Current status ==
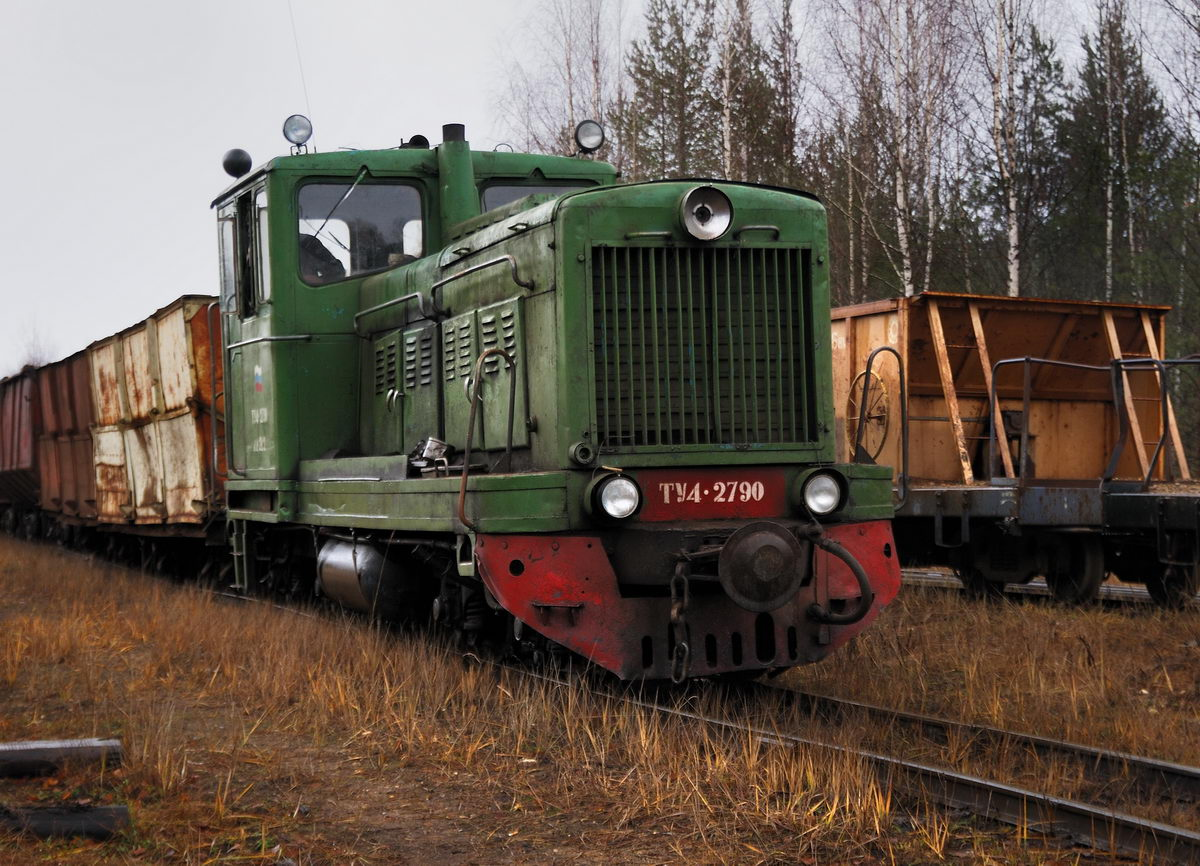
locomotive TU4 – No. 2790

Dymnoye peat railway emerged in the 1967s, in the area Verkhnekamsky District, in a settlement named Svetlopolyansk. The railway was built for hauling peat and workers and operates year-round with several pairs of trains a day. Peat is transshipped on broad gauge 1,520 mm (4 ft 11 27/32 in) rail line and taken to Kirov, Sharyu, to a combined heat and power (CHP).

== Rolling stock ==
=== Locomotives ===
- TU4 – № 2790
- TU6A – № 2172
- TU6D – № 0319
- ESU2A – № 715, 586, 1017
- TU7 – № 1595, 3050, 1595, 1252

=== Railroad car ===
- Flatcar
- Tank car
- Snowplow
- Crane (railroad)
- Tank car – fire train
- Passenger car (rail)
- Track laying cranes
- Open wagon for peat
- Hopper car to transport track ballast

== Gallery ==
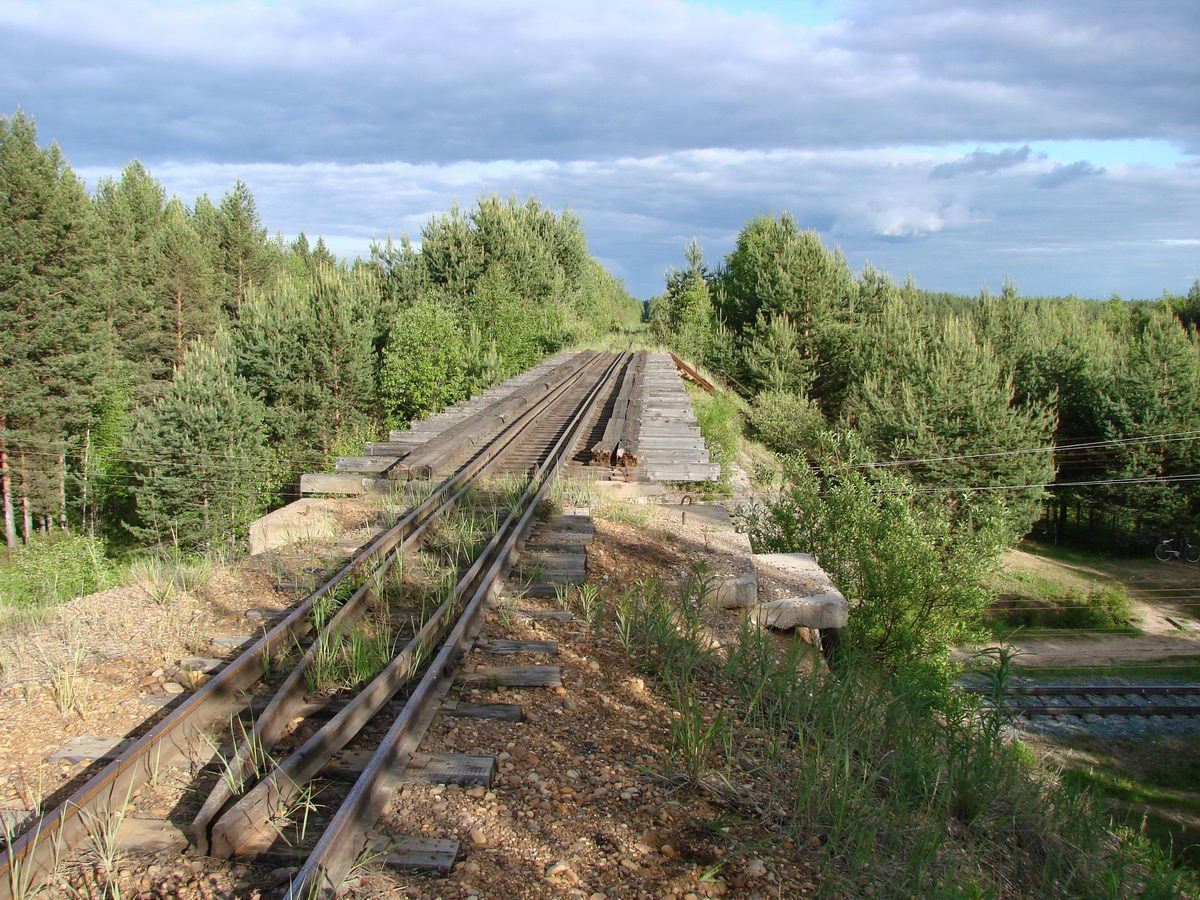
Railway bridges

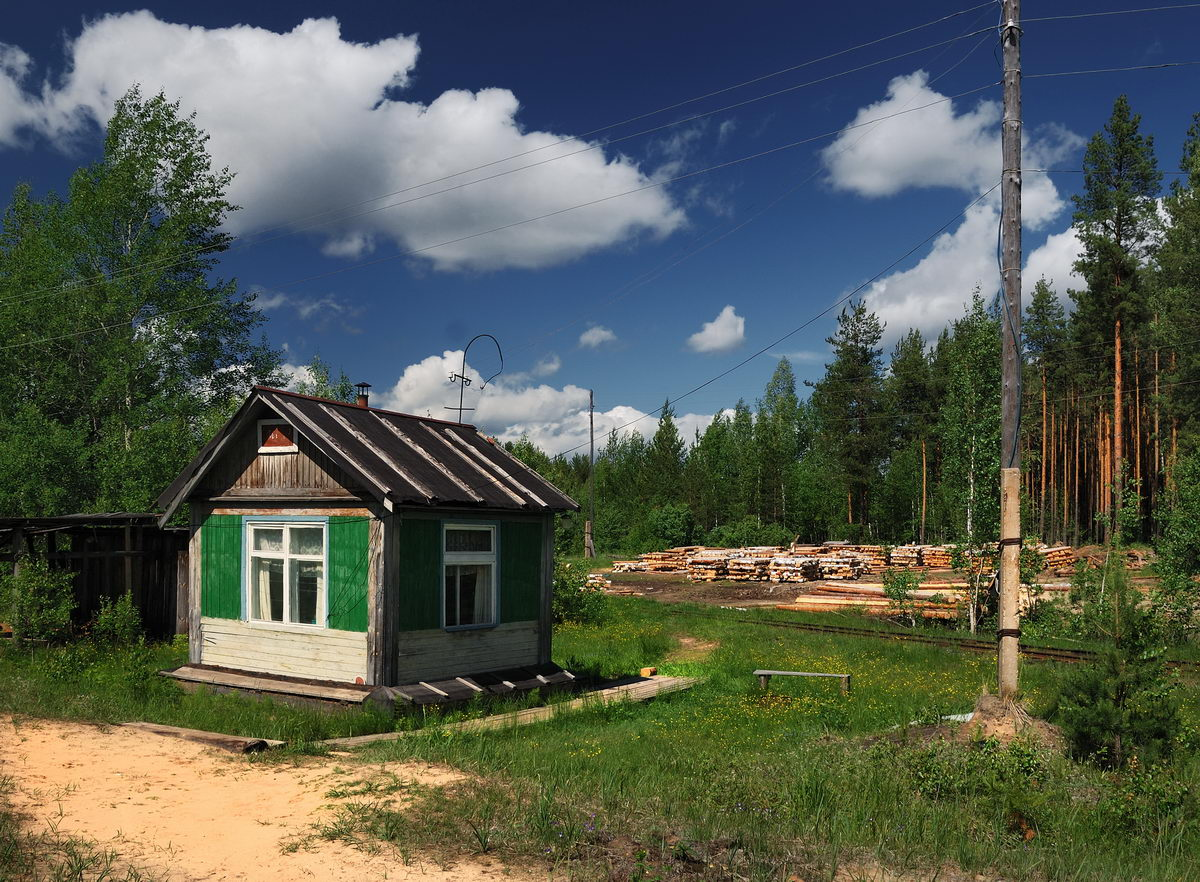
Building

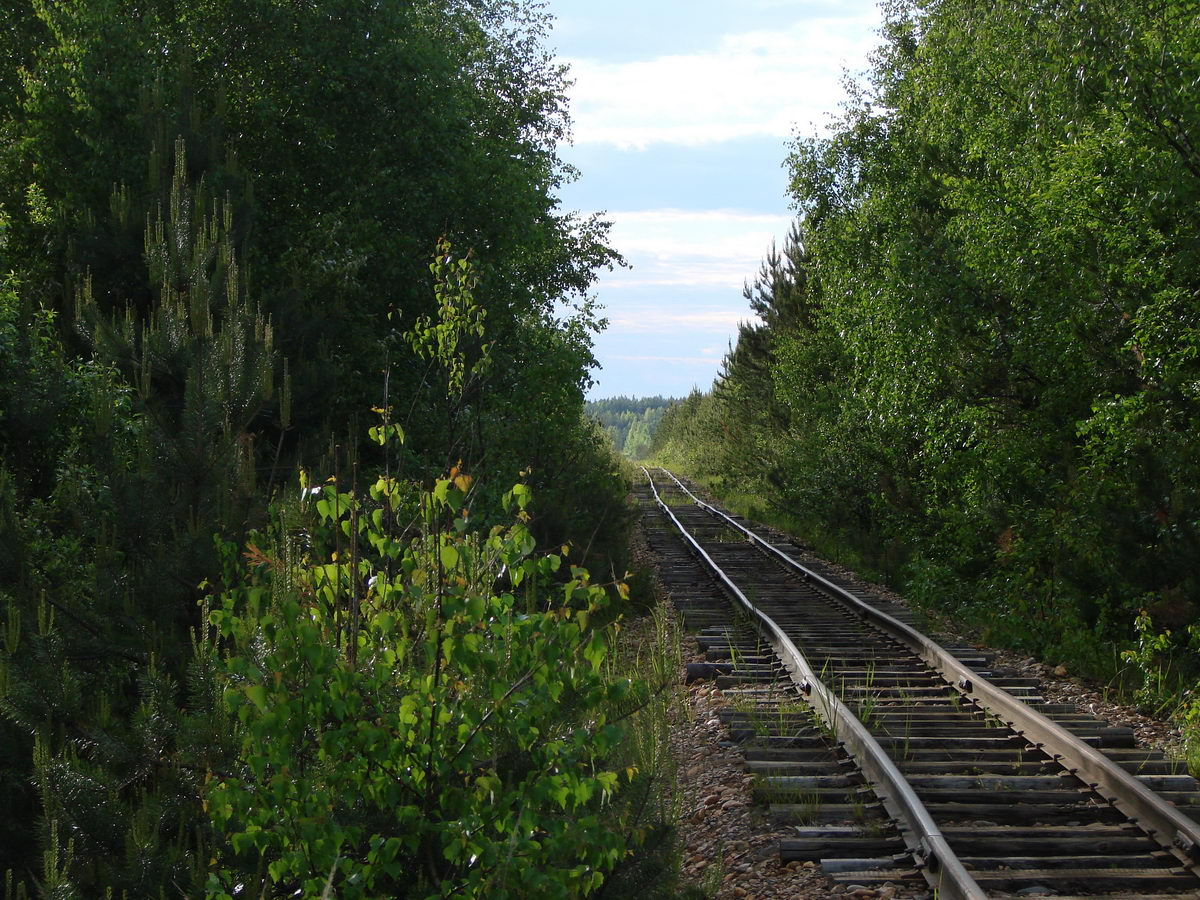
Narrow-gauge railway

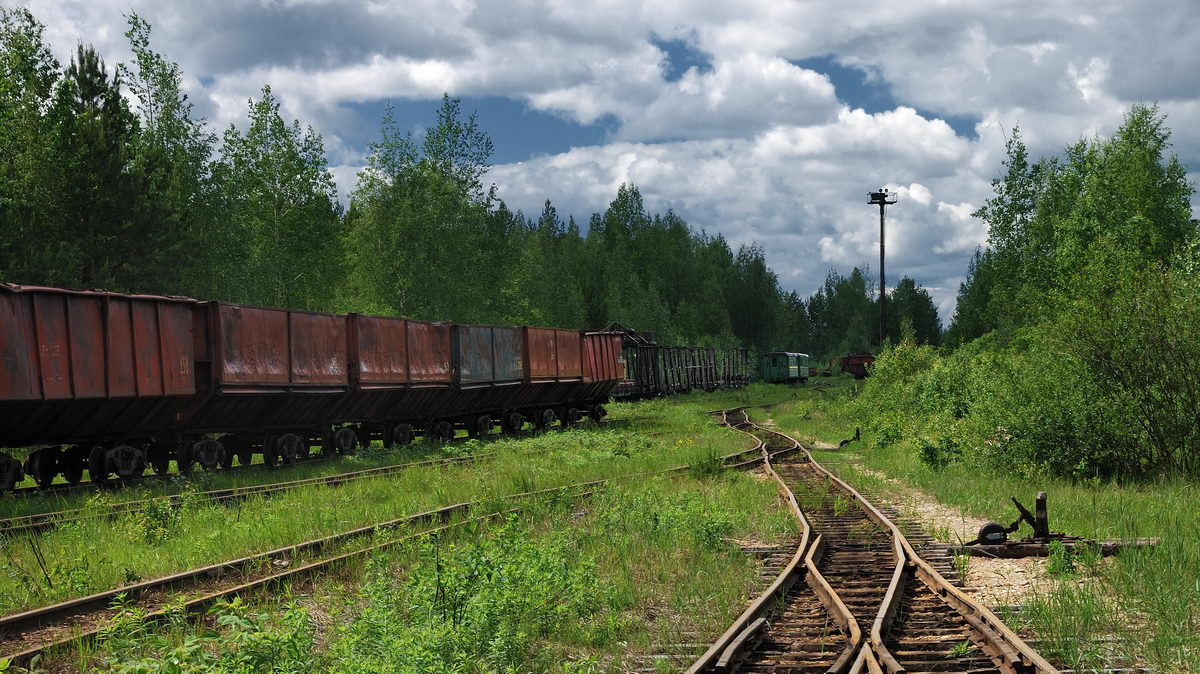
Classification yard

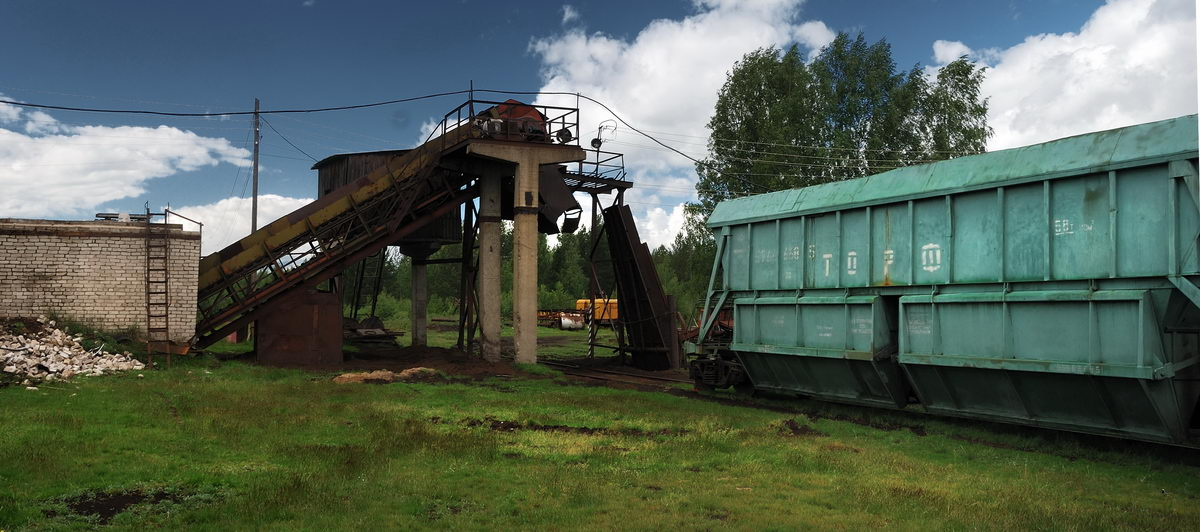
Rotary car dumper

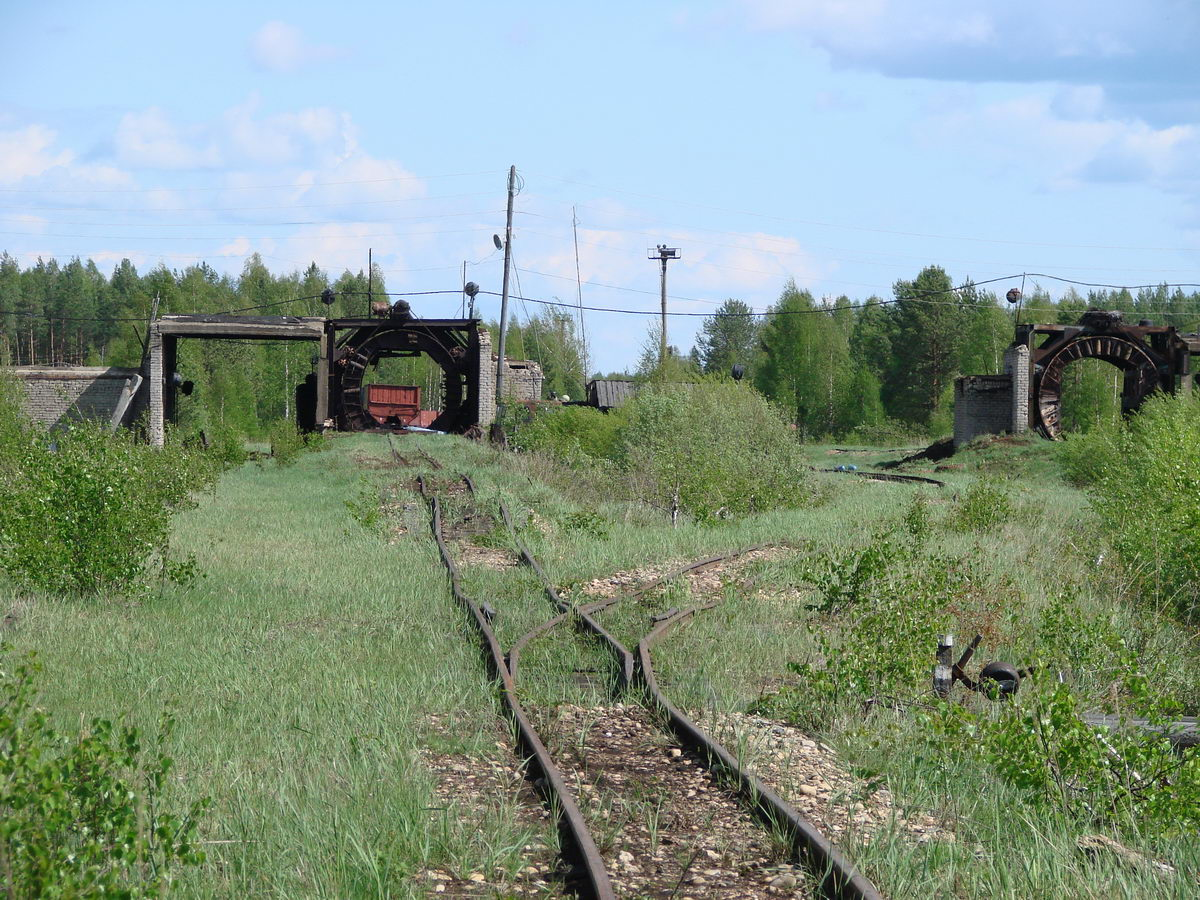
Rotary car dumper

== See also ==
- Narrow-gauge railways in Russia
- Gorokhovskoye peat railway
- Otvorskoye peat railway
- Pishchalskoye peat railway
