= List of chairmen of the Kirov Oblast Duma =

The chairman of the Kirov Oblast Duma is the presiding officer of that legislature.

== Chairmen ==
| Legislature | Name | Entered office | Left office |
|---|---|---|---|
| I | Mikhail Mikeev | April 14, 1994 | April 4, 1997 |
| II | Mikhail Mikeev | April 4, 1997 | April 9, 2001 |
| III | Aleksandr Strelnikov | April 9, 2001 | December 23, 2003 |
| III | Valery Kaisin | December 26, 2003 | September 25, 2005 |
| III | Vladimir Vasiliev | October 13, 2005 | March 23, 2006 |
| IV | Vladimir Vasiliev | March 23, 2006 | April 5, 2011 |
| V | Ivonin Gorky | April 5, 2011 | Present |

== Sources ==
- Kirov Oblast Duma
