= TU4 diesel locomotive =

Class of diesel locomotives

TU4
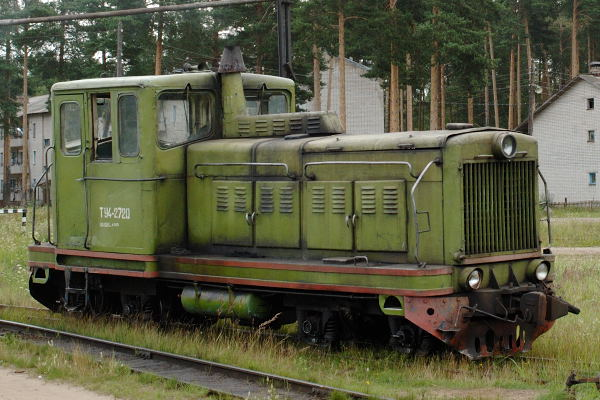
Type and origin
- Power type: Diesel
- Builder: Kambarka Engineering Works
- Build date: 1962 - 1974
Specifications
- Configuration
  - UIC: B'B'
- Gauge: 750 mm (2 ft 5 1/2 in); 1,067 mm (3 ft 6 in)
- Wheel diameter: 600 mm (23.62 in)
- Minimum curve: 40 m (131.23 ft)
- Length: 8,400 mm (27 ft 6 3/4 in)
- Width: 2,650 mm (8 ft 8 3/8 in)
- Height: 3,295 mm (10 ft 9 3/4 in)
- Axle load: 4 t (3.9 long tons; 4.4 short tons)
- Loco weight: 17.1 t (16.8 long tons; 18.8 short tons)(?)
- Fuel type: Diesel
- Prime mover: У1Д6-250ТК
- Transmission: hydraulic
Performance figures
- Maximum speed: 50 km/h (31 mph)
- Power output: 250 hp (190 kW)
Career
- Class: Belarus - ТУ4; Estonia - ТУ4; Finland - TU4; Latvia - ТУ4; Lithuania - ТУ4; Norway - ТU4; Russia - ТУ4; Sweden - TU4; Ukraine - ТУ4

TU4 (ТУ4) is a Soviet narrow-gauge diesel locomotive for the track gauge of 750 mm (2 ft 5 1/2 in).

== History ==
The first TU4 was built in 1962 at the Kambarka Engineering Works. 3210 TU4 locomotives were produced until 1974. The locomotives were used on many narrow-gauge railways to move cargo as well as passenger trains.

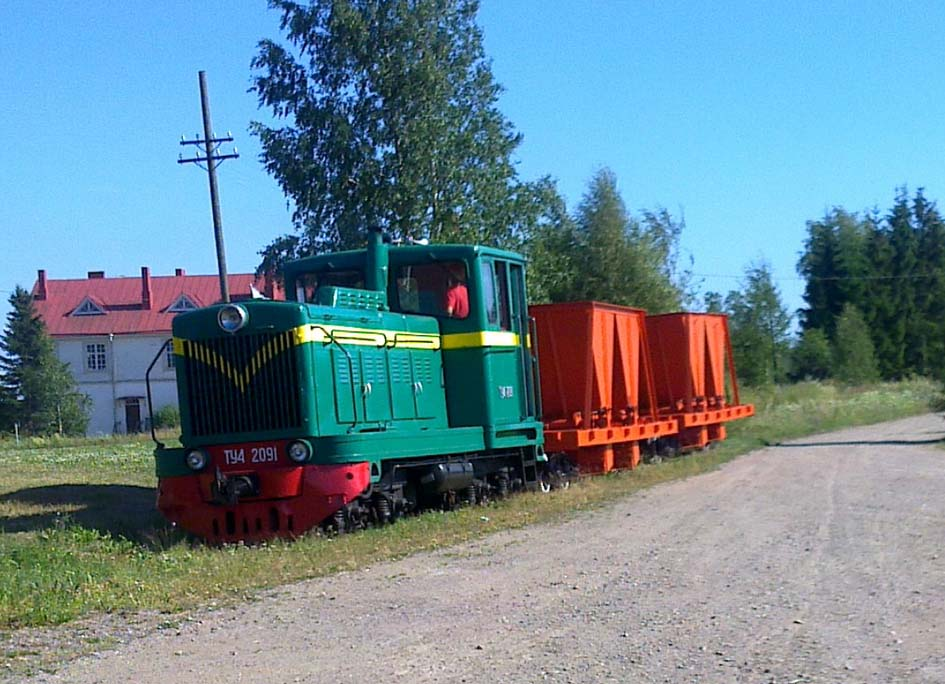
ТУ4-2091, Jokioinen Museum Railway

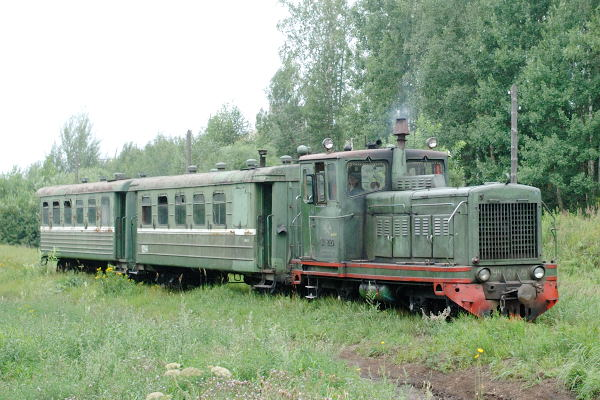
ТУ4-2129, Pishchalskoye railway

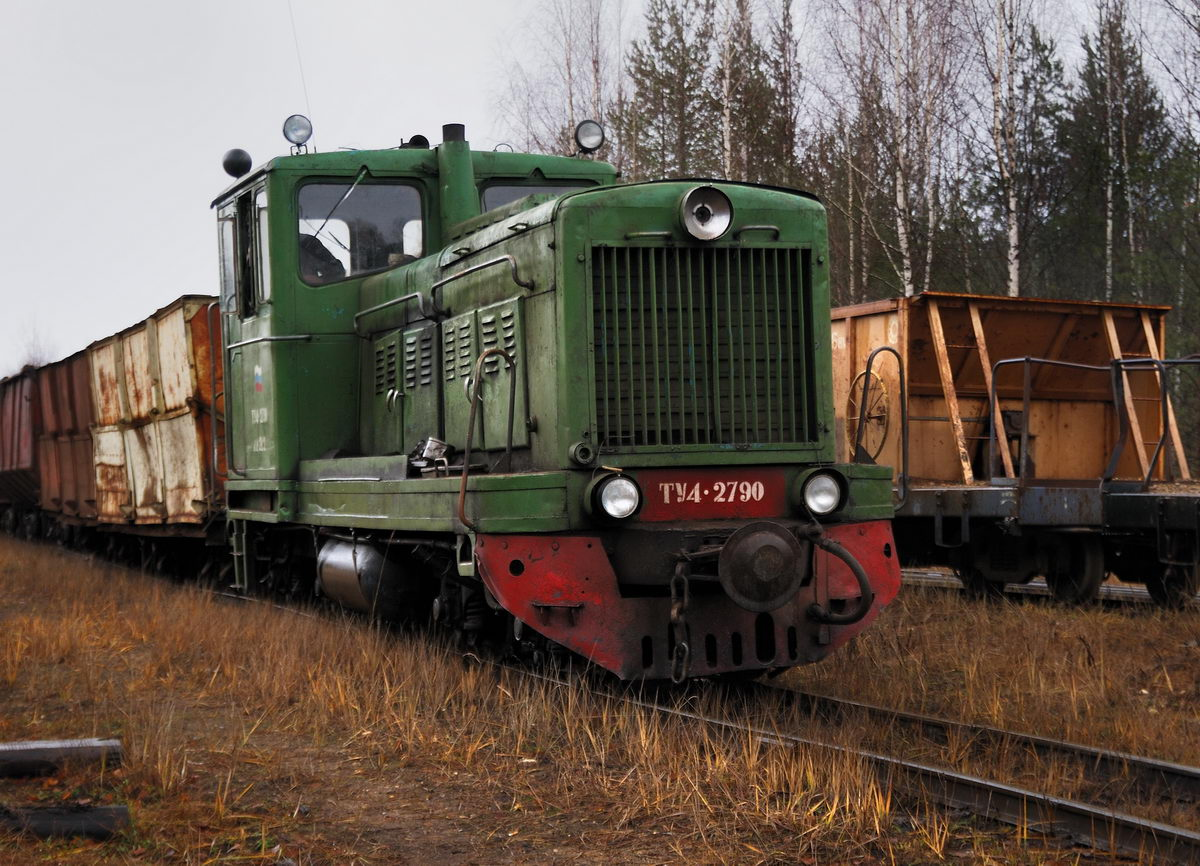
ТУ4-2790, Dymnoye railway

== See also ==
- Kambarka Engineering Works
