= Kirov constituency =

Legislative constituency in Russia

Kirov single-member constituency
- Constituency of the Russian State Duma

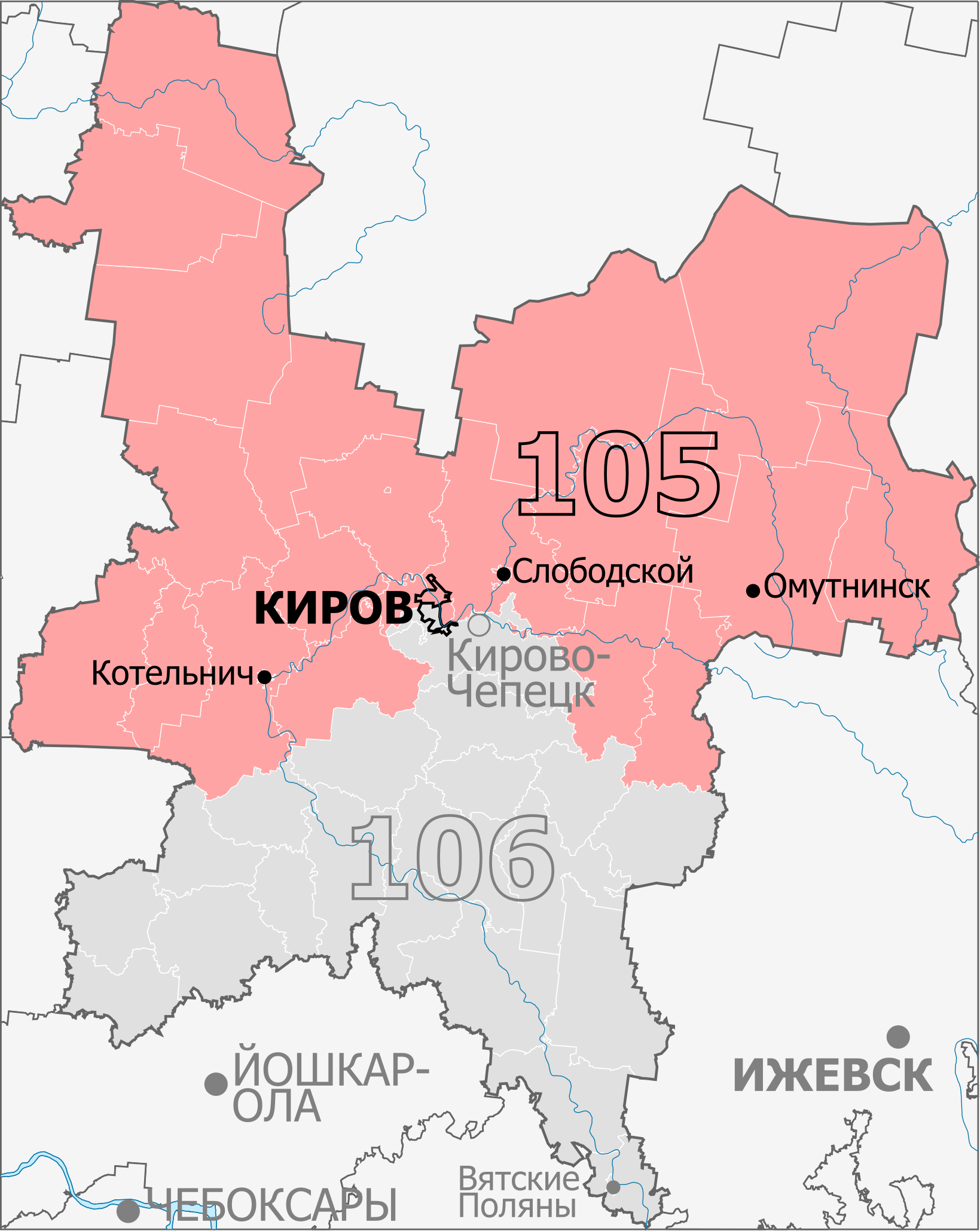
- Constituency boundaries since 2016
- Deputy: Boris Vesnin; United Russia
- Federal subject: Kirov Oblast
- Districts: Afanasyevsky, Belokholunitsky, Darovskoy, Falyonsky, Kirov (Oktyabrsky, Pervomaysky), Kotelnich, Kotelnichsky, Luzsky, Murashinsky, Nagorsky, Omutninsky, Oparinsky, Orichevsky, Orlovsky, ZATO Pervomaysky, Podosinovsky, Shabalinsky, Slobodskoy, Slobodskoy District, Svechinsky, Verkhnekamsky, Yuryansky, Zuyevsky
- Voters: 466,704 (2026)

The Kirov constituency (No.106 (Note: No.93 in 1993-1995 and 2003-2007, No.92 in 1995-2003, No.105 in 2016–2026)) is a Russian legislative constituency in Kirov Oblast. The constituency covers parts of Kirov and northern Kirov Oblast.

The constituency has been represented since 2026 by United Russia deputy Boris Vesnin, former Member of Legislative Assembly of Kirov Oblast and Uralchem executive, who won the open seats after two-term United Russia incumbent Rakhim Azimov successfully sought re-election on the party list.

== Boundaries ==
1993–1995: Afanasyevsky District, Belokholunitsky District, Kirov, Luzsky District, Murashinsky District, Nagorsky District, Omutninsky District, Oparinsky District, Pervomaysky, Podosinovsky District, Slobodskoy, Slobodskoy District, Verkhnekamsky District, Yuryansky District
The constituency covered oblast capital Kirov as well as rural northern Kirov Oblast.

1995–2003: Afanasyevsky District, Belokholunitsky District, Kirov, Luzsky District, Murashinsky District, Nagorsky District, Oparinsky District, Pervomaysky, Podosinovsky District, Slobodskoy, Slobodskoy District, Verkhnekamsky District, Yuryansky District
After 1995 redistricting the constituency was slightly changed, losing Omutninsky District to Sovetsk constituency.

2003–2007: Afanasyevsky District, Belokholunitsky District, Kirov, Luzsky District, Murashinsky District, Nagorsky District, Omutninsky District, Oparinsky District, Pervomaysky, Podosinovsky District, Slobodskoy, Slobodskoy District, Verkhnekamsky District, Yuryansky District
The constituency was slightly altered after the 2003 redistricting, regaining Omutninsky District from Sovetsk constituency.

2016–present: Afanasyevsky District, Belokholunitsky District, Darovskoy District, Falyonsky District, Kirov (Oktyabrsky, Pervomaysky), Kotelnich, Kotelnichsky District, Luzsky District, Murashinsky District, Nagorsky District, Omutninsky District, Oparinsky District, Orichevsky District, Orlovsky District, ZATO Pervomaysky, Podosinovsky District, Shabalinsky District, Slobodskoy, Slobodskoy District, Svechinsky District, Verkhnekamsky District, Yuryansky District, Zuyevsky District
The constituency was re-created for the 2016 election and retained almost all of its territory, losing southern half of Kirov to Kirovo-Chepetsk constituency. This seat instead gained territories in west-central and east-central Kirov Oblast, including the city Kotelnich, from the former Sovetsk constituency.

== Members elected ==
Election	Member	Party
1993	Mikhail Vakulenko	Liberal Democratic Party
1995	Vladimir Sergeyenkov (Note: elected Governor of Kirov Oblast in October 1996)	Independent
1997	Nikolay Shaklein	Independent
1999	Nikolay Shaklein	Independent
2003	Aleksey Rozuvan	United Russia
2007	Proportional representation - no election by constituency	
2011	Proportional representation - no election by constituency	
2016	Rakhim Azimov	United Russia
2021	Rakhim Azimov	United Russia
2026	Boris Vesnin	United Russia

== Election results ==
=== 1993 ===
Summary of the 12 December 1993 Russian legislative election in the Kirov constituency
Candidate	Party	Votes	%
Mikhail Vakulenko	Liberal Democratic Party	53,459	15.23%
Vladimir Kornilov	Independent	–	13.90%
Marat Frenkel	Yavlinsky–Boldyrev–Lukin	–	–
Vladimir Kazakovtsev	Communist Party	–	–
Yevgeny Livatov	Independent	–	–
Vladimir Ponomaryov	Independent	–	–
Yegor Savin	Choice of Russia	–	–
Viktor Slobodchikov	Independent	–	–
Total		351,024	100%

=== 1995 ===
Summary of the 17 December 1995 Russian legislative election in the Kirov constituency
Candidate	Party	Votes	%
Vladimir Sergeyenkov	Independent	96,574	24.24%
Viktor Savinykh	Bloc of Independents	66,671	16.73%
Mikhail Vakulenko (incumbent)	Liberal Democratic Party	58,126	14.59%
Valery Turulo	Communists and Working Russia - for the Soviet Union	24,696	6.20%
Nikolay Martyanov	Our Home – Russia	20,312	5.10%
Anzhey Mikheyev	Independent	19,915	5.00%
Vladimir Shalayev	Forward, Russia!	18,839	4.73%
Valery Fokin	Congress of Russian Communities	15,359	3.85%
Anatoly Bashlakov	Serving Russia	12,378	3.11%
Aleksandr Popov	Trade Unions and Industrialists – Union of Labour	10,412	2.61%
Arkady Mikhaylov	People's Union	7,634	1.92%
Sergey Plyusnin	Independent	5,202	1.31%
against all		36,379	9.13%
Total		398,448	100%

=== 1997 ===
Summary of the 23 March 1997 Russian by-election in the Kirov constituency
Candidate	Party	Votes	%
Nikolay Shaklein	Independent	76,316	28.56%
Sergey Voronov	Independent	61,909	23.17%
Anatoly Denisov	Independent	45,227	16.93%
Valery Turulo	Independent	15,571	5.83%
Vladimir Molokov	Independent	13,846	5.18%
Mikhail Koptev	Independent	8,998	3.37%
Yevgeny Derishev	Independent	6,556	2.45%
against all		27,135	10.15%
Total		267,213	100%

=== 1999 ===
Summary of the 19 December 1999 Russian legislative election in the Kirov constituency
Candidate	Party	Votes	%
Nikolay Shaklein (incumbent)	Independent	170,570	44.47%
Oleg Baboshin	Union of Right Forces	32,164	8.39%
Mikhail Vakulenko	Independent	29,624	7.72%
Mikhail Savinykh	Yabloko	28,190	7.35%
Vladimir Agalakov	For Civil Dignity	18,660	4.87%
Yury Akusba	Communists and Workers of Russia - for the Soviet Union	10,705	2.79%
Aleksandr Kolosov	Independent	10,654	2.78%
Vladimir Sysolyatin	Fatherland – All Russia	8,039	2.10%
Nikolay Gvozdev	Independent	7,740	2.02%
Sergey Luzyanin	Independent	6,325	1.65%
Nikolay Dengin	Independent	4,824	1.26%
Yevgeny Klevachkin	Our Home – Russia	4,162	1.09%
Nikolay Solomin	Spiritual Heritage	1,890	0.49%
against all		44,325	11.56%
Total		383,540	100%

=== 2003 ===
Summary of the 7 December 2003 Russian legislative election in the Kirov constituency
Candidate	Party	Votes	%
Aleksey Rozuvan	United Russia	90,967	23.70%
Vladimir Sergeyenkov	Independent	50,494	13.16%
Oleg Skachkov	Independent	37,411	9.75%
Aleksandr Poglazov	Union of Right Forces	33,556	8.74%
Dmitry Ikonnikov	Yabloko	25,908	6.75%
Valery Turulo	Russian Communist Workers Party-Russian Party of Communists	19,698	5.13%
Aleksandr Ryazanov	Liberal Democratic Party	16,927	4.41%
Vladimir Kulikov	Independent	15,836	4.13%
Nikolay Bezdenezhnykh	Russian Pensioners' Party-Party of Social Justice	14,243	3.71%
Boris Shabalin	United Russian Party Rus'	12,599	3.28%
against all		54,752	14.27%
Total		384,230	100%

=== 2016 ===
Summary of the 18 September 2016 Russian legislative election in the Kirov constituency
Candidate	Party	Votes	%
Rakhim Azimov	United Russia	109,333	51.22%
Aleksandr Maltsev	A Just Russia	28,764	13.47%
Aleksey Votintsev	Communist Party	27,346	12.81%
Nikolay Barsukov	Communists of Russia	14,404	6.75%
Andrey Orlov	Party of Growth	7,912	3.71%
Sergey Rogozhkin	Patriots of Russia	7,462	3.50%
Andrey Perov	Yabloko	5,710	2.67%
Total		213,465	100%

=== 2021 ===
Summary of the 17-19 September 2021 Russian legislative election in the Kirov constituency
Candidate	Party	Votes	%
Rakhim Azimov (incumbent)	United Russia	95,926	43.77%
Albert Bikalyuk	A Just Russia — For Truth	32,651	14.90%
Kirill Cherkasov	Liberal Democratic Party	16,186	7.39%
Nikolay Barsukov	Communists of Russia	15,582	7.11%
Aleksey Semeyshchev	Communist Party	15,448	7.05%
Andrey Iglin	New People	12,244	5.59%
Svetlana Opaleva	Party of Pensioners	11,567	5.28%
Roman Bokov	Yabloko	5,920	2.70%
Fyodor Luginin	Rodina	4,666	2.13%
Total		219,144	100%

=== 2026 ===
Summary of the 18-20 September 2026 Russian legislative election in the Kirov constituency
Candidate	Party	Votes	%
Boris Vesnin	United Russia	90,734	39.37%
Sergey Mamayev	Communist Party	41,409	17.97%
Vladimir Ponaryev	Liberal Democratic Party	32,603	14.15%
Andrey Iglin	New People	21,370	9.27%
Yekaterina Kolotova	A Just Russia	19,736	8.56%
Aleksandr Markov	Party of Pensioners	9,990	4.34%
Aleksey Makhanov	Communists of Russia	5,998	2.60%
Total		230,443	100%
