= Afanasyevo =

Afanasyevo (Russian: Афана́сьево) is the name of several inhabited localities in Russia.

Urban localities

- Afanasyevo, Kirov Oblast, an urban-type settlement in Afanasyevsky District of Kirov Oblast

Rural localities

- Afanasyevo, Ivanovo Oblast, a selo in Komsomolsky District of Ivanovo Oblast
- Afanasyevo, Kaluga Oblast, a village in Peremyshlsky District of Kaluga Oblast
- Afanasyevo, Chukhlomsky District, Kostroma Oblast, a village in Nozhkinskoye Settlement of Chukhlomsky District of Kostroma Oblast
- Afanasyevo, Manturovsky District, Kostroma Oblast, a village in Leontyevskoye Settlement of Manturovsky District of Kostroma Oblast
- Afanasyevo, Kursk Oblast, a selo in Afanasyevsky Selsoviet of Oboyansky District of Kursk Oblast
- Afanasyevo, Lipetsk Oblast, a selo in Afanasyevsky Selsoviet of Izmalkovsky District of Lipetsk Oblast
- Afanasyevo, Kolomensky District, Moscow Oblast, a village in Zarudenskoye Rural Settlement of Kolomensky District of Moscow Oblast
- Afanasyevo, Naro-Fominsky District, Moscow Oblast, a village in Volchenkovskoye Rural Settlement of Naro-Fominsky District of Moscow Oblast
- Afanasyevo, Bogorodsky District, Nizhny Novgorod Oblast, a selo in Shapkinsky Selsoviet of Bogorodsky District of Nizhny Novgorod Oblast
- Afanasyevo, Chkalovsky District, Nizhny Novgorod Oblast, a village in Vershilovsky Selsoviet of Chkalovsky District of Nizhny Novgorod Oblast
- Afanasyevo, Semyonov, Nizhny Novgorod Oblast, a village in Ilyino-Zaborsky Selsoviet of the city of oblast significance of Semyonov, Nizhny Novgorod Oblast
- Afanasyevo, Smolensk Oblast, a village in Tretyakovskoye Rural Settlement of Dukhovshchinsky District of Smolensk Oblast
- Afanasyevo, Aleksinsky District, Tula Oblast, a selo in Plastovsky Rural Okrug of Aleksinsky District of Tula Oblast
- Afanasyevo, Venyovsky District, Tula Oblast, a village in Olenkovsky Rural Okrug of Venyovsky District of Tula Oblast
- Afanasyevo, Tver Oblast, a village in Kalininsky District of Tver Oblast
- Afanasyevo, Alexandrovsky District, Vladimir Oblast, a village in Alexandrovsky District, Vladimir Oblast
- Afanasyevo, Sobinsky District, Vladimir Oblast, a village in Sobinsky District, Vladimir Oblast
- Afanasyevo, Vyaznikovsky District, Vladimir Oblast, a village in Vyaznikovsky District, Vladimir Oblast

== See also ==
- Afanasy
- Afanasyev
- Afanasyevsky (disambiguation)
