= Darovskoy =

Darovskoy (masculine), Darovskaya (feminine), or Darovskoye (neuter) may refer to:

- Darovskoy District, a district of Kirov Oblast, Russia
- Darovskoy (urban-type settlement), an urban-type settlement in Darovskoy District of Kirov Oblast, Russia
