= Murashinsky =

Murashinsky (masculine), Murashinskaya (feminine), or Murashinskoye (neuter) may refer to:

- Murashinsky District, a district of Kirov Oblast, Russia
- Murashinskoye Urban Settlement, a municipal formation which the Town of Murashi in Murashinsky District of Kirov Oblast, Russia is incorporated as
