= Falyonsky =

Falyonsky/Falensky (masculine), Falyonskaya/Falenskaya (feminine), or Falyonskoye/Falenskoye (neuter) may refer to:

- Falyonsky District, a district of Kirov Oblast, Russia
- Falenskaya, a rural locality (a village) in Vologda Oblast, Russia
