= Nagorsky =

Nagorsky (masculine), Nagorskaya (feminine), or Nagorskoye (neuter) may refer to:

- Nagorsky District, a district of Kirov Oblast, Russia
- Nagorsky (rural locality) (Nagorskaya, Nagorskoye), name of several rural localities in Russia

== See also ==
- Nagorski, a surname
