= Afanasyevsky =

Afanasyevsky (masculine), Afanasyevskaya (feminine), or Afanasyevskoye (neuter) may refer to:

- Afanasyevsky District, a district of Kirov Oblast, Russia
- Afanasyevsky (rural locality) (Afanasyevskaya, Afanasyevskoye), name of several rural localities in Russia
