= Nagorsky (rural locality) =

One of several places in Russia

Nagorsky (Russian: Нагорский; masculine), Nagorskaya (Нагорская; feminine), or Nagorskoye (Нагорское; neuter) is the name of several rural localities in Russia:

- Nagorskoye, Kirov Oblast, a selo in Talitsky Rural Okrug of Falyonsky District of Kirov Oblast
- Nagorskoye, Kostroma Oblast, a village in Sudayskoye Settlement of Chukhlomsky District of Kostroma Oblast
- Nagorskoye, Kurgan Oblast, a selo in Nagorsky Selsoviet of Pritobolny District of Kurgan Oblast
- Nagorskoye, Tver Oblast, a village in Kalyazinsky District of Tver Oblast
- Nagorskoye, Vologda Oblast, a village in Raboche-Krestyansky Selsoviet of Vologodsky District of Vologda Oblast
- Nagorskoye, Yaroslavl Oblast, a village in Osetsky Rural Okrug of Lyubimsky District of Yaroslavl Oblast
- Nagorskaya, a village in Rostovsky Selsoviet of Ustyansky District of Arkhangelsk Oblast
