= Yurya =

Yurya Юрья
- Urban-type settlement
- Interactive map of Yurya
- Location of Yurya Yurya (Kirov Oblast)
- Coordinates: 59.0424°N 49.2790°E
- Country: Russia
- Federal subject: Kirov Oblast
- Administrative district: Yuryansky District
- Founded: 1898

Population (2010 Census)
  - Total: 5,668
  - Estimate (2025): 4,721 (−16.7%)
- Time zone: UTC+3 (MSK)
- Postal code: 613600
- OKTMO ID: 33649151051

Yurya (Russian: Юрья) is an urban locality (an urban-type settlement) in Yuryansky District of Kirov Oblast, Russia. Population: 5,668 (2010 census); 6,169 (2002 census); 14,821 (1989 Soviet census).

== Gallery ==
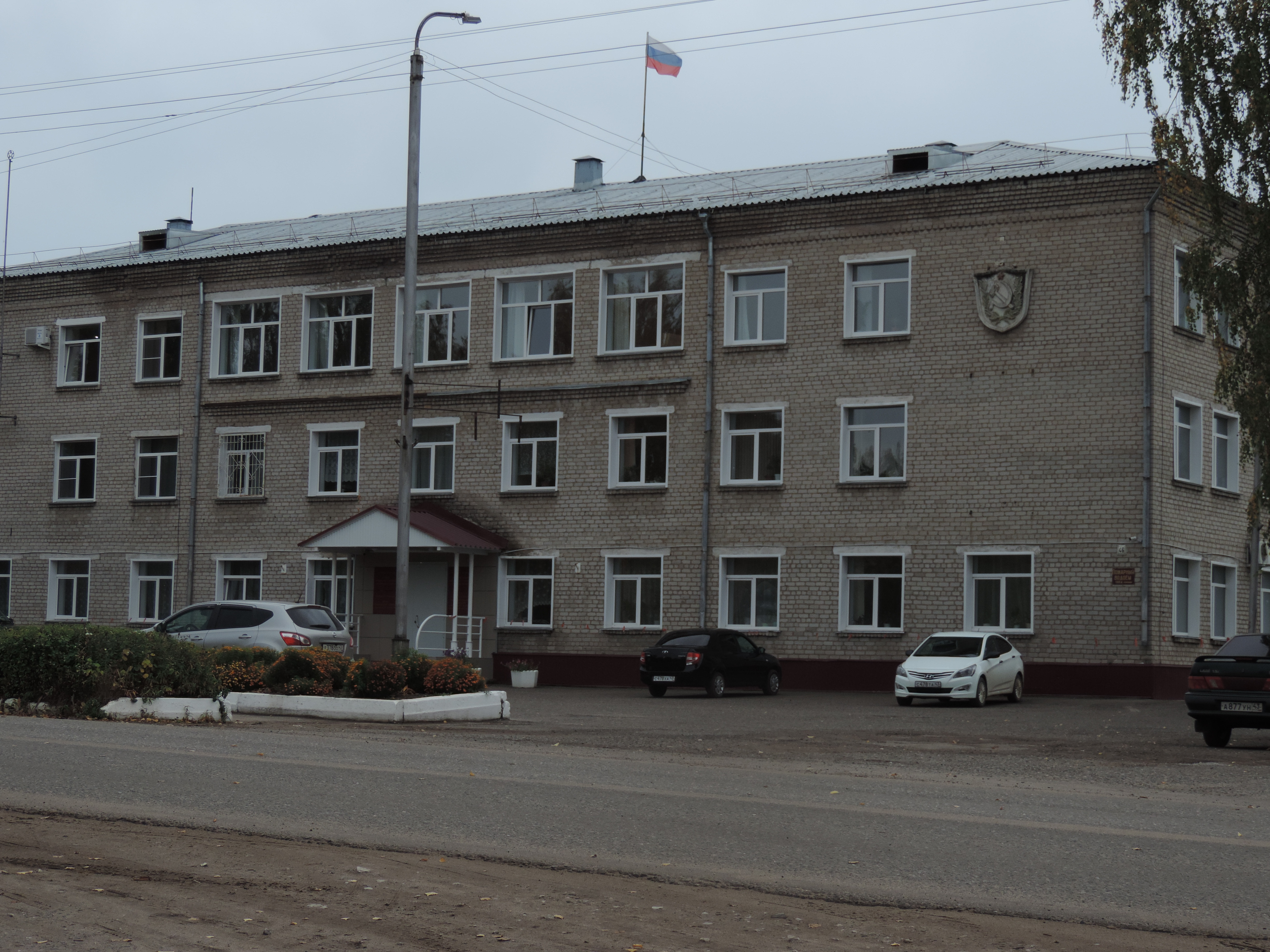
Administrtion of Yurya District

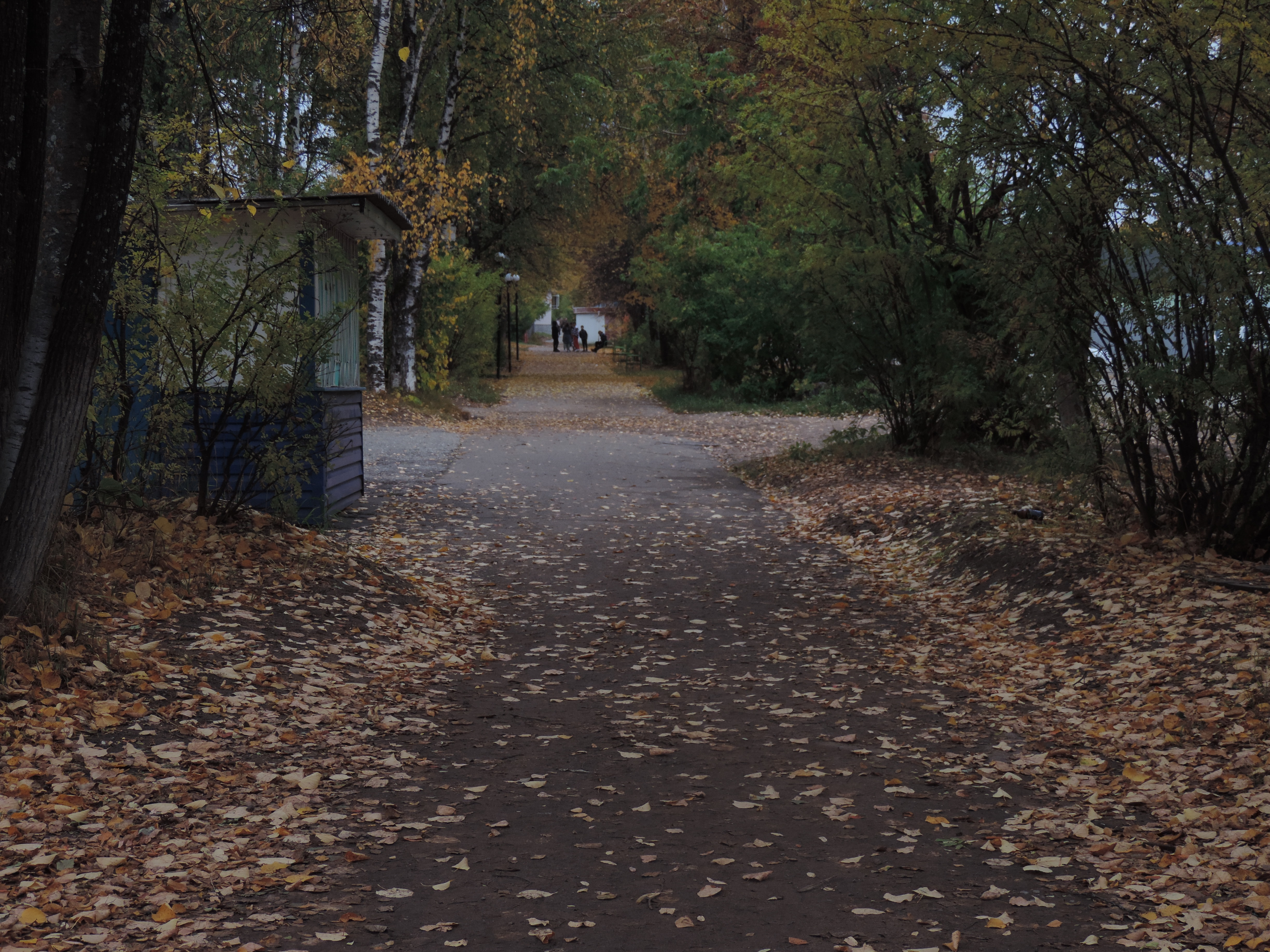
Lenin's street

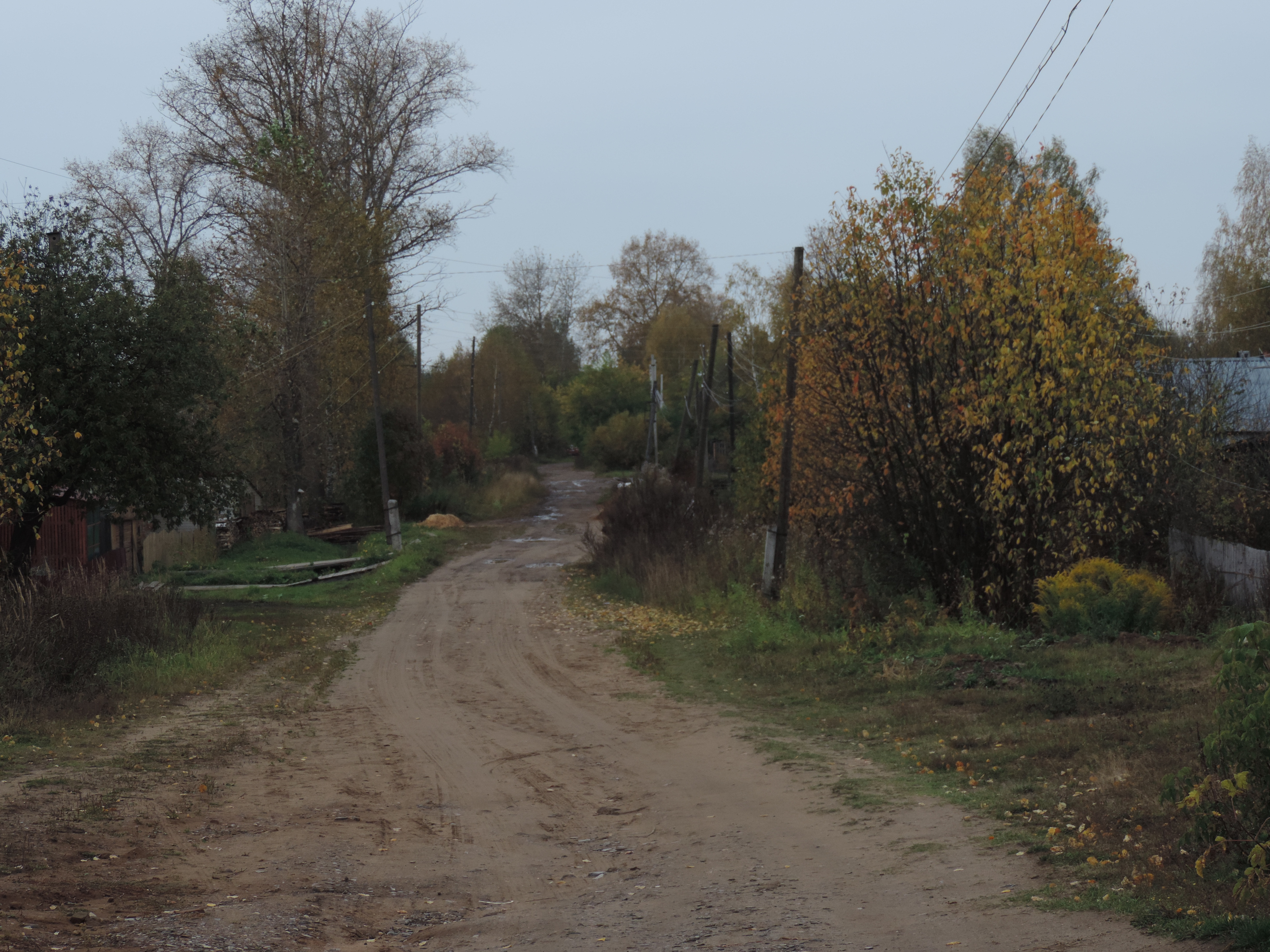
Pushkin's street

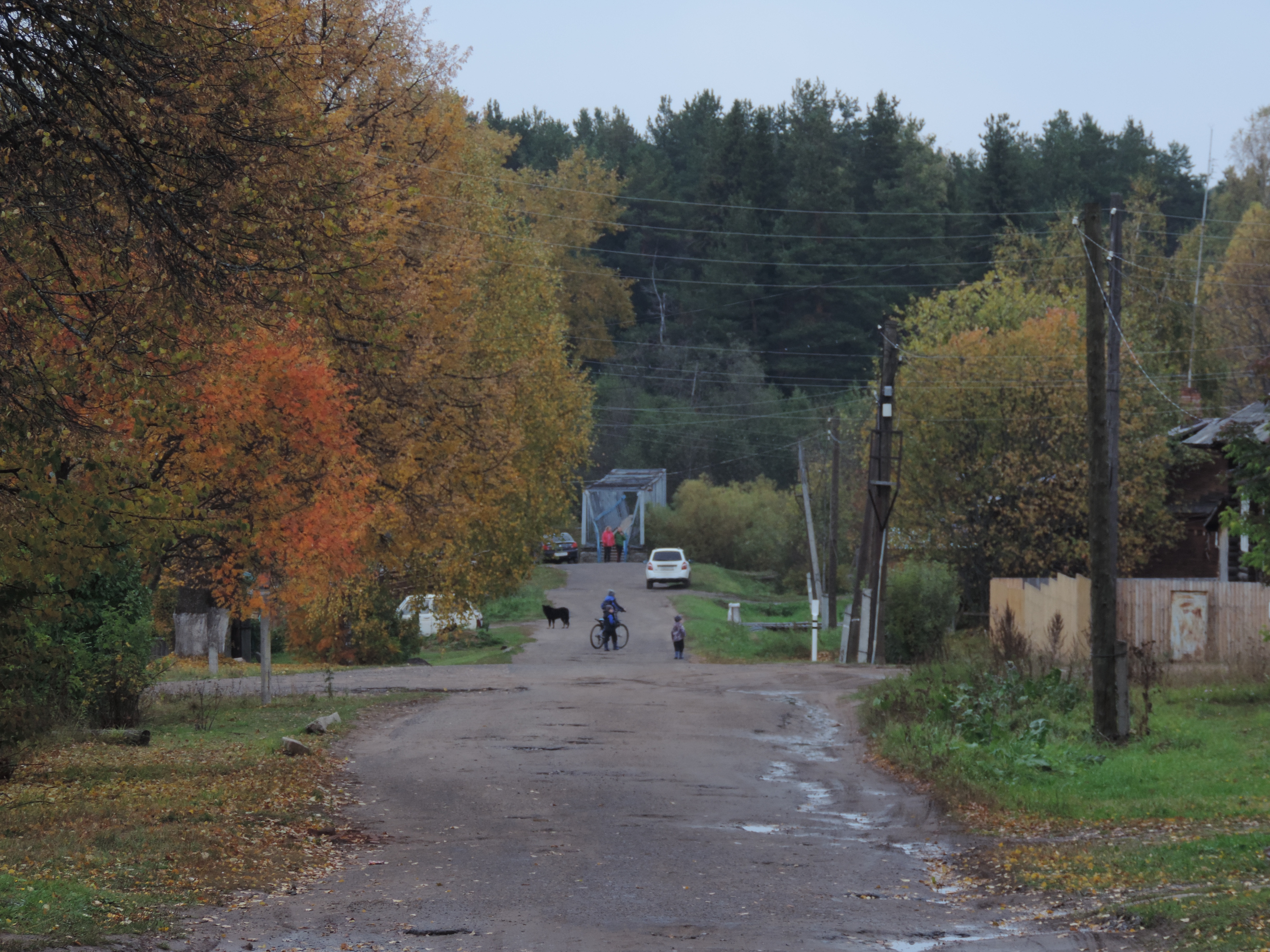
Soviet street

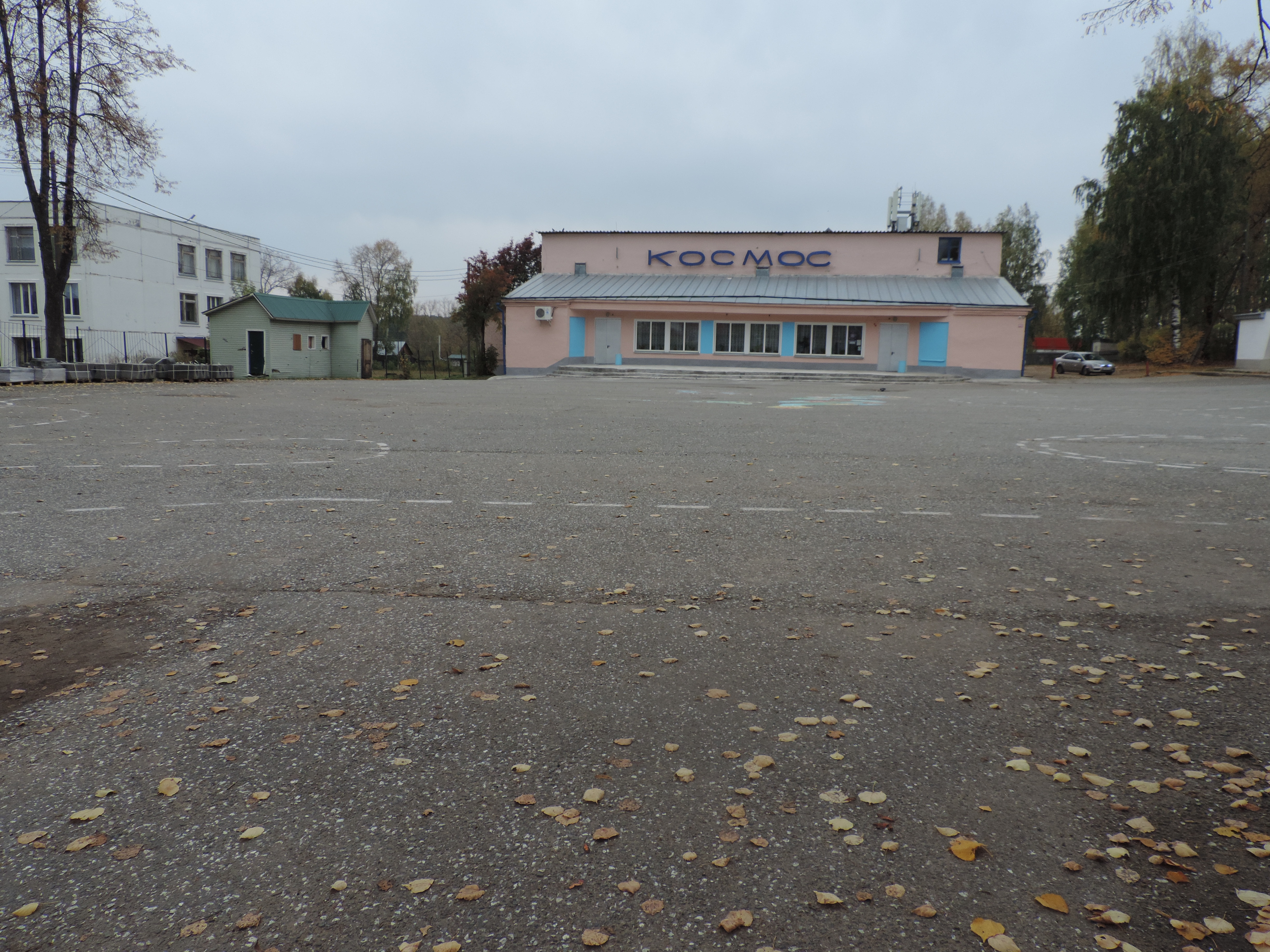
Hope Square and cinema "Космос" (rus.: space)
