= Nagurski =

Nagurski is a surname. Notable people with the surname include:

- Bronko Nagurski (1908–1990), Canadian-born National Football League player and professional wrestler
- Bronko Nagurski, Jr. (1937–2011), his son, American-born Canadian Football League player
- Jan Nagórski or Ivan Nagurski (1888–1976), Polish aviation pioneer

== See also ==
- Nagorski
