= Falyonki =

Falyonki Фалёнки
- Urban-type settlement
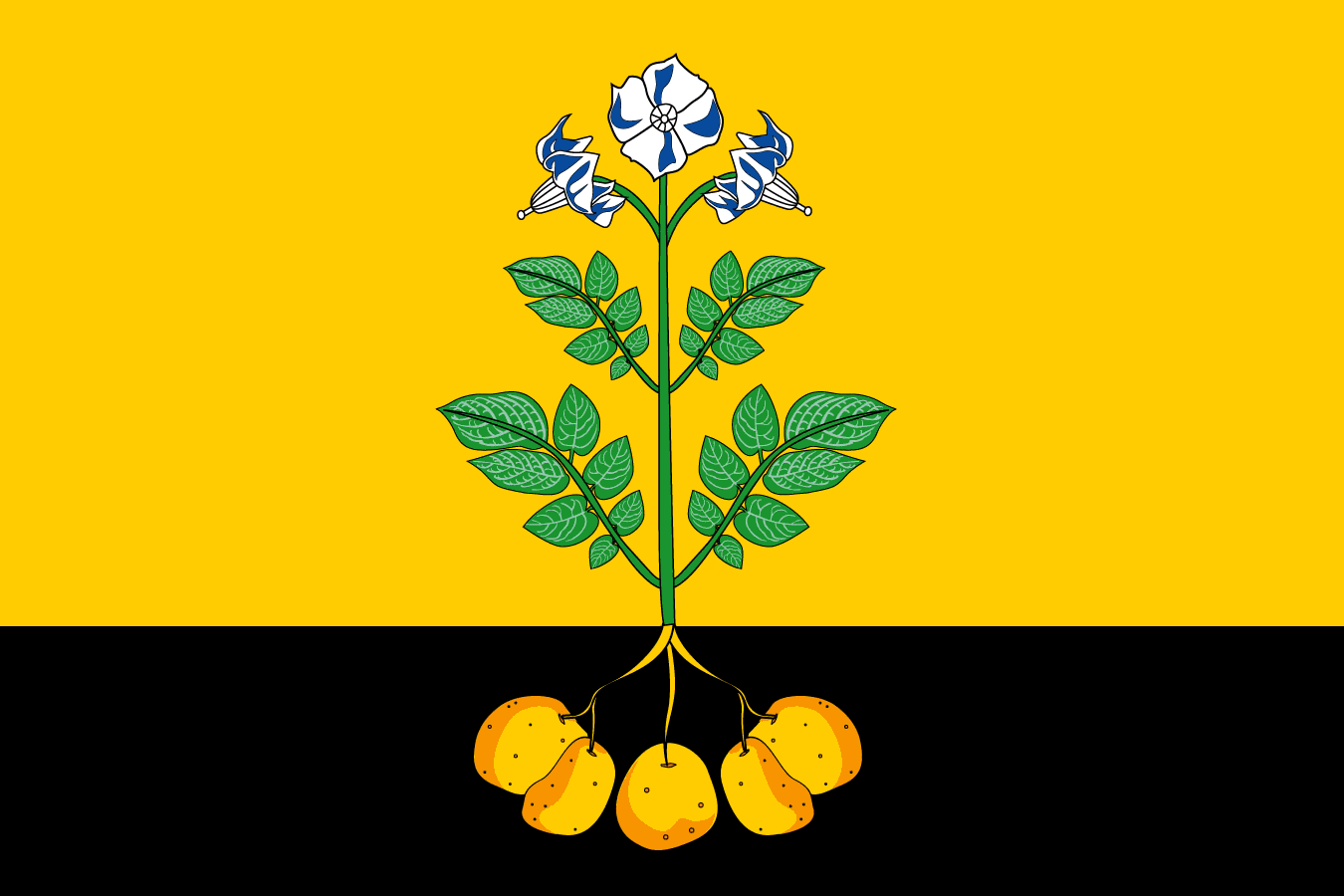
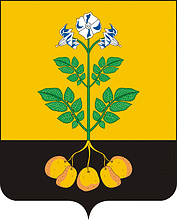
- Flag Coat of arms
- Interactive map of Falyonki
- Location of Falyonki Falyonki (Kirov Oblast)
- Coordinates: 58.3577°N 51.5956°E
- Country: Russia
- Federal subject: Kirov Oblast
- Administrative district: Falyonsky District
- Founded: 1898

Population (2010 Census)
  - Total: 5,256
  - Estimate (2025): 3,952 (−24.8%)
- Time zone: UTC+3 (MSK)
- Postal code: 612500
- OKTMO ID: 33643151051

Falyonki (Russian: Фалёнки) is an urban locality (an urban-type settlement) in Falyonsky District of Kirov Oblast, Russia. Population: 5,256 (2010 census); 5,990 (2002 census); 6,810 (1989 Soviet census).
