= Nagorsk =

Nagorsk Нагорск
- Urban-type settlement
- Interactive map of Nagorsk
- Location of Nagorsk Nagorsk (Kirov Oblast)
- Coordinates: 59.3158°N 50.8012°E
- Country: Russia
- Federal subject: Kirov Oblast
- Administrative district: Nagorsky District
- Founded: 1595
- Elevation: 160 m (520 ft)

Population (2010 Census)
  - Total: 4,903
  - Estimate (2025): 3,904 (−20.4%)
- Time zone: UTC+3 (MSK)
- Postal codes: 613260, 613261
- OKTMO ID: 33625151051

Nagorsk (Russian: Нагорск) is an urban locality (an urban-type settlement) in Nagorsky District of Kirov Oblast, Russia. Population: 4,903 (2010 census); 5,138 (2002 census); 5,824 (1989 Soviet census).
