= Afanasyevo, Kirov Oblast =

Urban settlement in Russia

Afanasyevo Афанасьево
- Urban-type settlement
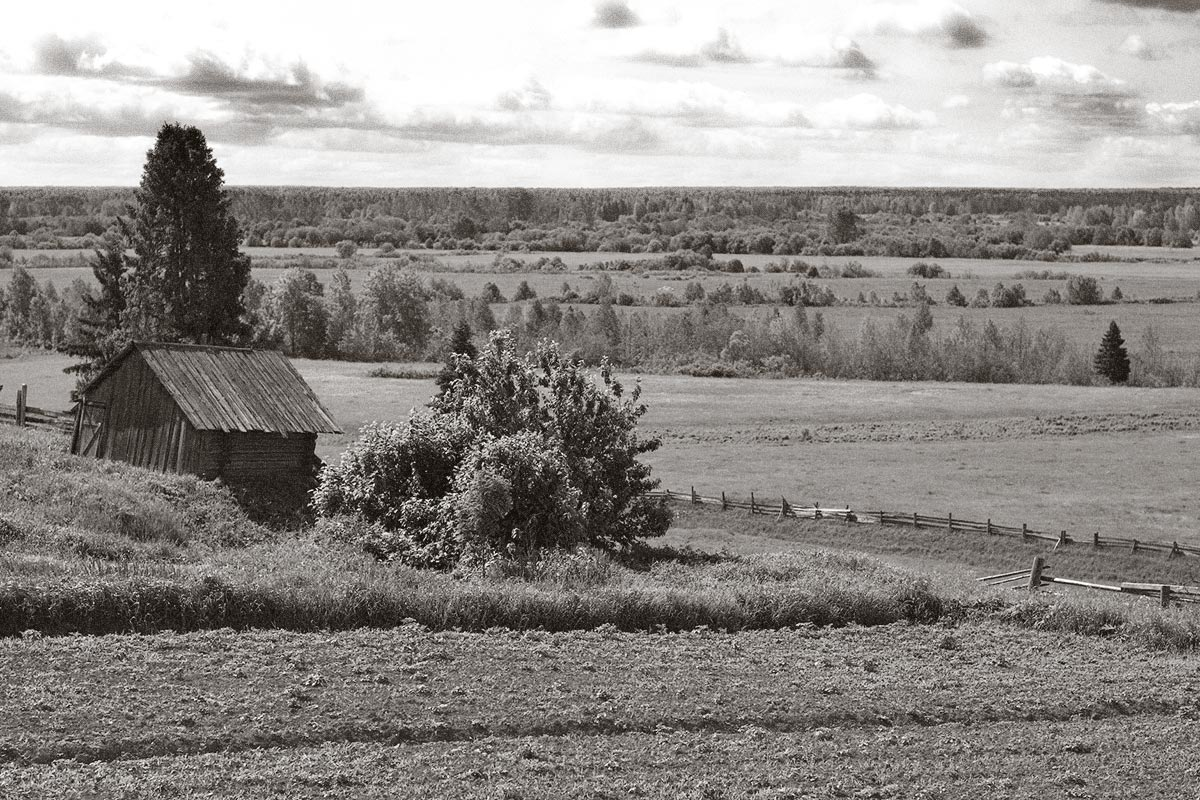
- View of the Kama from Afanasyevo
- Interactive map of Afanasyevo
- Location of Afanasyevo Afanasyevo (Kirov Oblast)
- Coordinates: 58°51′12″N 53°15′37″E
- Country: Russia
- Federal subject: Kirov Oblast
- Administrative district: Afanasyevsky District
- Founded: 1730
- Elevation: 217 m (712 ft)

Population (2010 Census)
  - Total: 3,435
  - Estimate (2025): 3,330 (−3.1%)

Administrative status
  - Capital of: Afanasyevsky District

Municipal status
  - Municipal district: Afanasyevsky Municipal District
  - Urban settlement: Afanasyevskoye Urban Settlement
  - Capital of: Afanasyevsky Municipal District, Afanasyevskoye Urban Settlement
- Time zone: UTC+3 (MSK)
- Postal code: 613060
- OKTMO ID: 33603151051

Afanasyevo (Russian: Афанасьево) is an urban-type settlement and the administrative center of Afanasyevsky District of Kirov Oblast, Russia. Population: 3,435 (2010 census); 3,474 (2002 census); 4,982 (1989 Soviet census).

== Geography ==
Located in a forested area on the right bank of the Kama River, the settlement covers 346 ha (850 acres) and includes 24 km (15 mi) of roads.

== History ==
The settlement was first recorded as the pogost of Zyuzdino-Afanasyevskoye in 1607, with a wooden church that burned down in 1729. According to documents in the oblast archives, the parish centered on the church was founded in the mid-17th century. A copy of the church charter from 1681 giving permission to build a new church was preserved. A second wooden church was built in 1730 and was dismantled in 1807, and a third in 1872.

By the late 19th century, the volost centered on Zyuzdino-Afanasyevskoye, part of Glazovsky Uyezd of Vyatka Governorate, included 34 villages and settlements with a mixed population of Permians and Russians. The inhabitants engaged in farming, logging, and fishing, and seasonally worked in the iron ore and tar deposits of the region. At the time, the village included the volost administration, a zemstvo, parish and craft trade schools, and a public library. The villagers saw their first films in 1913 and before 1917 the village had only two streets. Exiled writer Vladimir Korolenko mentioned in the village in his stories about the area.

After the village came under the control of the Bolsheviks in March 1919, a detachment under the command of N.F. Kuznetsov and commissar P.E. Kharin defended the village from the army of Alexander Kolchak. A monument was later erected in Afanasyevo on the site of the mass grave of the village defenders. In 1918, future professor and historian Dmitry Ageyevich Chugayev created the first Komsomol cell in the village.

According to the 1926 Soviet Census, the village had 338 inhabitants. When the administrative division of the area was reorganized in 1929, Zyuzdino-Afanasyevo became the district center of Zyuzdinsky District of Kirov Oblast. A power station was built in the village in 1932, followed by the first machine tractor station in the district in 1938, a house of culture in 1939, and a dairy factory in 1942. An interfarm construction organization established in 1958 was responsible for the district administration building completed in 1975, the regional consumer services enterprise in 1965, a network of shops, a clinic, a secondary school, and a grain warehouse, among others. Afanasyevo gained urban-type settlement status in 1966, three years after being renamed, although the first asphalt roads in the settlement were not paved until 1988.

The district muse of fine arts was opened in 1989 and a covered market was built in 1998. By the early 2000s, the village included a bank, district communications center, district and children's libraries, two kindergartens, a music school, a vocational school, and a movie theater, among others. Businesses included a printing house, the dairy factory, and a forestry enterprise.
