= Afanasyevsky (rural locality) =

Afanasyevsky (Russian: Афана́сьевский; masculine), Afanasyevskaya (Афана́сьевская; feminine), or Afanasyevskoye (Афана́сьевское; neuter) is the name of several rural localities in Russia:

- Afanasyevsky, Oryol Oblast, a settlement in Chakhinsky Selsoviet of Mtsensky District of Oryol Oblast
- Afanasyevsky, Rostov Oblast, a khutor in Voloshinskoye Rural Settlement of Millerovsky District of Rostov Oblast
- Afanasyevsky, Sverdlovsk Oblast, a settlement in Achitsky District of Sverdlovsk Oblast
- Afanasyevskoye, Ivanovo Oblast, a selo in Shuysky District of Ivanovo Oblast
- Afanasyevskoye, Sverdlovsk Oblast, a selo in Achitsky District of Sverdlovsk Oblast
- Afanasyevskoye, Yaroslavl Oblast, a selo in Voskresensky Rural Okrug of Lyubimsky District of Yaroslavl Oblast
- Afanasyevskaya, Republic of Karelia, a village in Pudozhsky District of the Republic of Karelia
- Afanasyevskaya, Babayevsky District, Vologda Oblast, a village in Novolukinsky Selsoviet of Babayevsky District of Vologda Oblast
- Afanasyevskaya, Ozeretsky Selsoviet, Tarnogsky District, Vologda Oblast, a village in Ozeretsky Selsoviet of Tarnogsky District of Vologda Oblast
- Afanasyevskaya, Shevdenitsky Selsoviet, Tarnogsky District, Vologda Oblast, a village in Shevdenitsky Selsoviet of Tarnogsky District of Vologda Oblast
- Afanasyevskaya, Vashkinsky District, Vologda Oblast, a village in Andreyevsky Selsoviet of Vashkinsky District of Vologda Oblast
