= Nagorski =

Nagorski or Nagórski (feminine: Nagórska; plural: Nagórscy) is a Polish surname. It may refer to:

- Andrew Nagorski (born 1947), American journalist
- Jan Nagórski (1888–1976), Polish aviator

== See also ==
- Nagurski
- Nagorsky (disambiguation)
