= Rakhim Azimov =

Russian politician (born 1964)

- Рахим Азимов
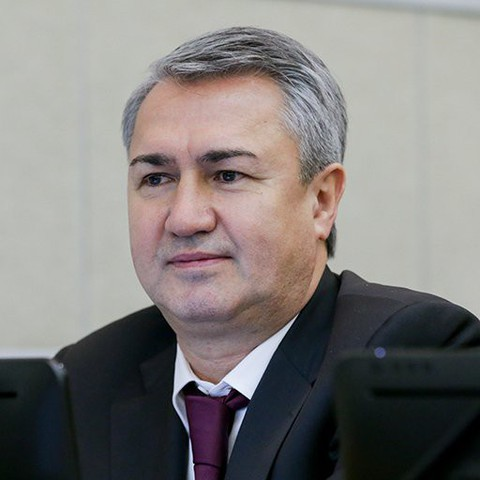

Member of the State Duma for Kirov Oblast
- Incumbent
- Assumed office 5 October 2016
- Preceded by: constituency re-established
- Constituency: Kirov (No. 105)

Member of the Legislative Assembly of the Kirov Oblast
- In office 13 September 2015 – 18 September 2016

Russian Federation Senator from the Komi Republic
- In office 27 February 2002 – 11 February 2003
- Preceded by: Yury Volkov
- Succeeded by: Aleksey Grisihin

Personal details
- Born: 16 August 1964 (age 61) Shurab, Sughd Region, Tajik SSR, USSR
- Party: United Russia
- Spouse: Elena
- Children: 3
- Education: G. V. Plekhanov Leningrad State Mining Institute and Technical University; Diplomatic Academy of the Ministry of Foreign Affairs of the Russian Federation
- Religion: Sunni

Rakhim Azizboyevich Azimov (Russian: Рахи́м Азизбо́евич Ази́мов; born 16 August 1964, Shurab, Sughd Region) is a Russian political figure, deputy of the 7th and 8th State Duma convocations.

In 1986 Azimov graduated from the G. V. Plekhanov Leningrad State Mining Institute and Technical University. Later he continued his education at the Diplomatic Academy of the Ministry of Foreign Affairs of the Russian Federation (2002) and St. Petersburg University of the Russian Interior Ministry (2011). In 2004 he was awarded a Doctor of Technical Sciences degree.

From 1986 to 1991, he worked as a mine foreman in the Komi Republic. From 1994 to 1996, he was a part of the trade delegation of the Komi Republic in Moscow. During the 2000 Russian presidential election Azimov was Putin's confidant. In 2002-2003 he was a member of the Federation Council.

Since September 2021, he has served as a deputy of the 8th State Duma convocation. He ran with the United Russia to represent the Kirov constituency.

== Sanctions ==
On February 23, 2022, he was added to the European Union’s sanctions list for actions and policies that undermine the territorial integrity, sovereignty, and independence of Ukraine and further destabilize the country.

On February 24, 2022, he was included in Canada’s list of “close associates of the regime” for voting in favor of recognizing the independence of the so-called republics in Donetsk and Luhansk.

On March 24, 2022, amid Russia’s invasion of Ukraine, he was added to the U.S. sanctions list for “being complicit in Putin’s war” and “supporting the Kremlin’s efforts to invade Ukraine.” The U.S. Department of State stated that State Duma deputies use their powers to persecute dissent and political opponents, suppress freedom of information, and restrict human rights and fundamental freedoms of Russian citizens.

Subsequently, on similar grounds, he was also included in the sanctions lists of the United Kingdom, Switzerland, Australia, Japan, Ukraine, and New Zealand.

== Awards ==
- Medal of the Order "For Merit to the Fatherland" (2020)
- Medal "For Distinction in the Protection of Public Order"
