= Murashi, Kirov Oblast =

Town in Kirov Oblast, Russia

Murashi Мураши
- Town
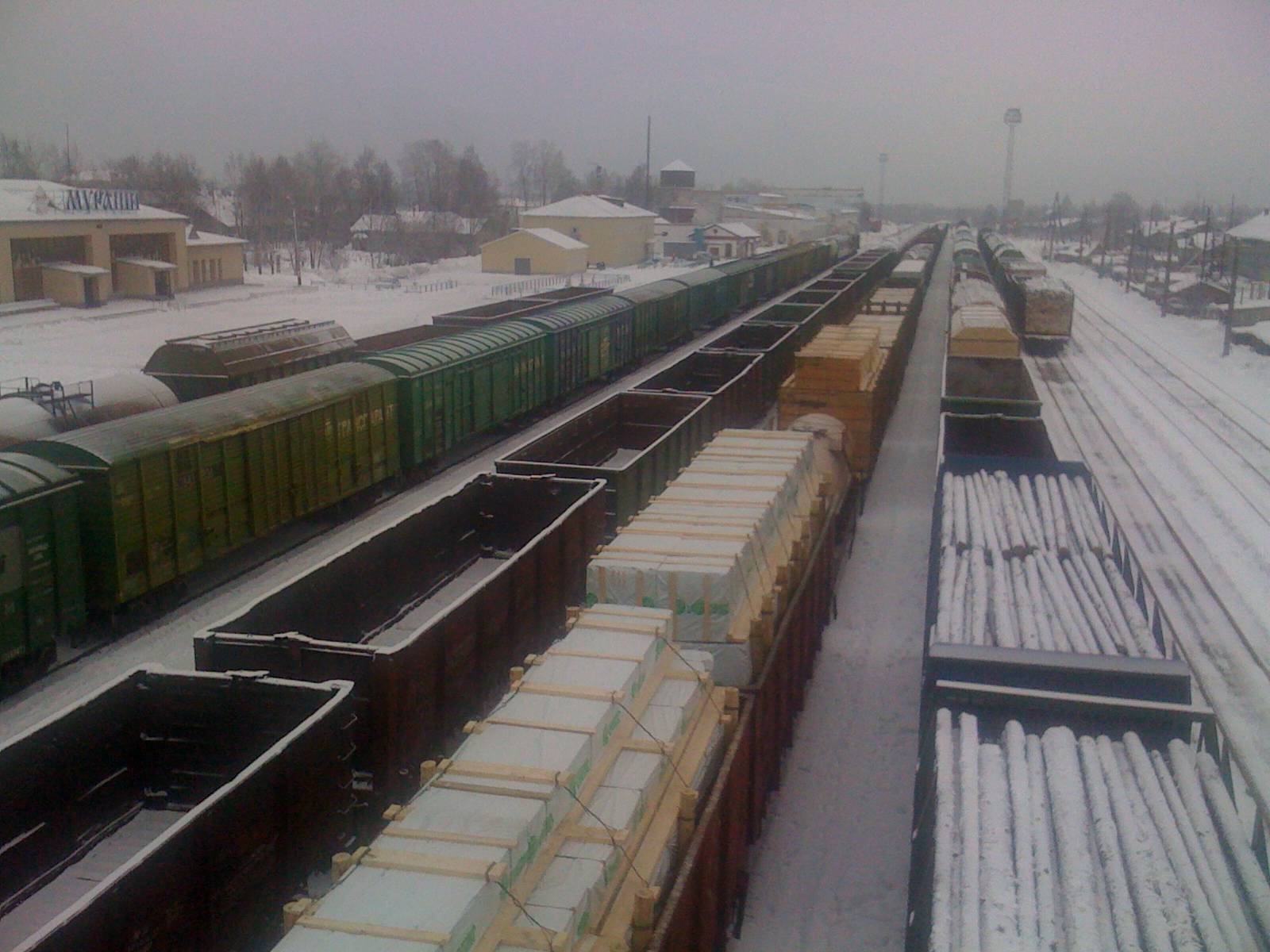
- Murashi railroad station, Murashi

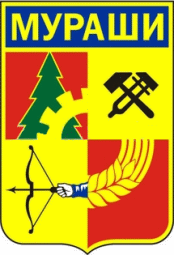
- Coat of arms
- Interactive map of Murashi
- Location of Murashi Murashi (Kirov Oblast)
- Coordinates: 59°24′N 48°59′E
- Country: Russia
- Federal subject: Kirov Oblast
- Administrative district: Murashinsky District
- TownSelsoviet: Murashi
- Founded: 1895
- Town status since: 1944
- Elevation: 210 m (690 ft)

Population (2010 Census)
  - Total: 6,750
  - Estimate (2021): 5,700 (−15.6%)

Administrative status
  - Capital of: Murashinsky District, Town of Murashi

Municipal status
  - Municipal district: Murashinsky Municipal District
  - Urban settlement: Murashinskoye Urban Settlement
  - Capital of: Murashinsky Municipal District, Murashinskoye Urban Settlement
- Time zone: UTC+3 (MSK)
- Postal codes: 613710, 613711
- OKTMO ID: 33624101001

Murashi (Russian: Мураши́) is a town and the administrative center of Murashinsky District in Kirov Oblast, Russia, located 112 kilometers (70 mi) northwest of Kirov, the administrative center of the oblast, on the Kirov–Syktyvkar highway. Population: 6,750 (2010 census); 7,650 (2002 census); 10,059 (1989 Soviet census).

== History ==
It was founded in 1895 as a settlement due to the construction of the railway station on the Vyatka–Kotlas railway. It was granted town status in 1944.

== Administrative and municipal status ==
Within the framework of administrative divisions, Murashi serves as the administrative center of Murashinsky District. As an administrative division, it is, together with ten rural localities, incorporated within Murashinsky District as the Town of Murashi. As a municipal division, the Town of Murashi is incorporated within Murashinsky Municipal District as Murashinskoye Urban Settlement.
