= Slobodskoy, Kirov Oblast =

Town in Kirov Oblast, Russia

Slobodskoy Слободской
- Town
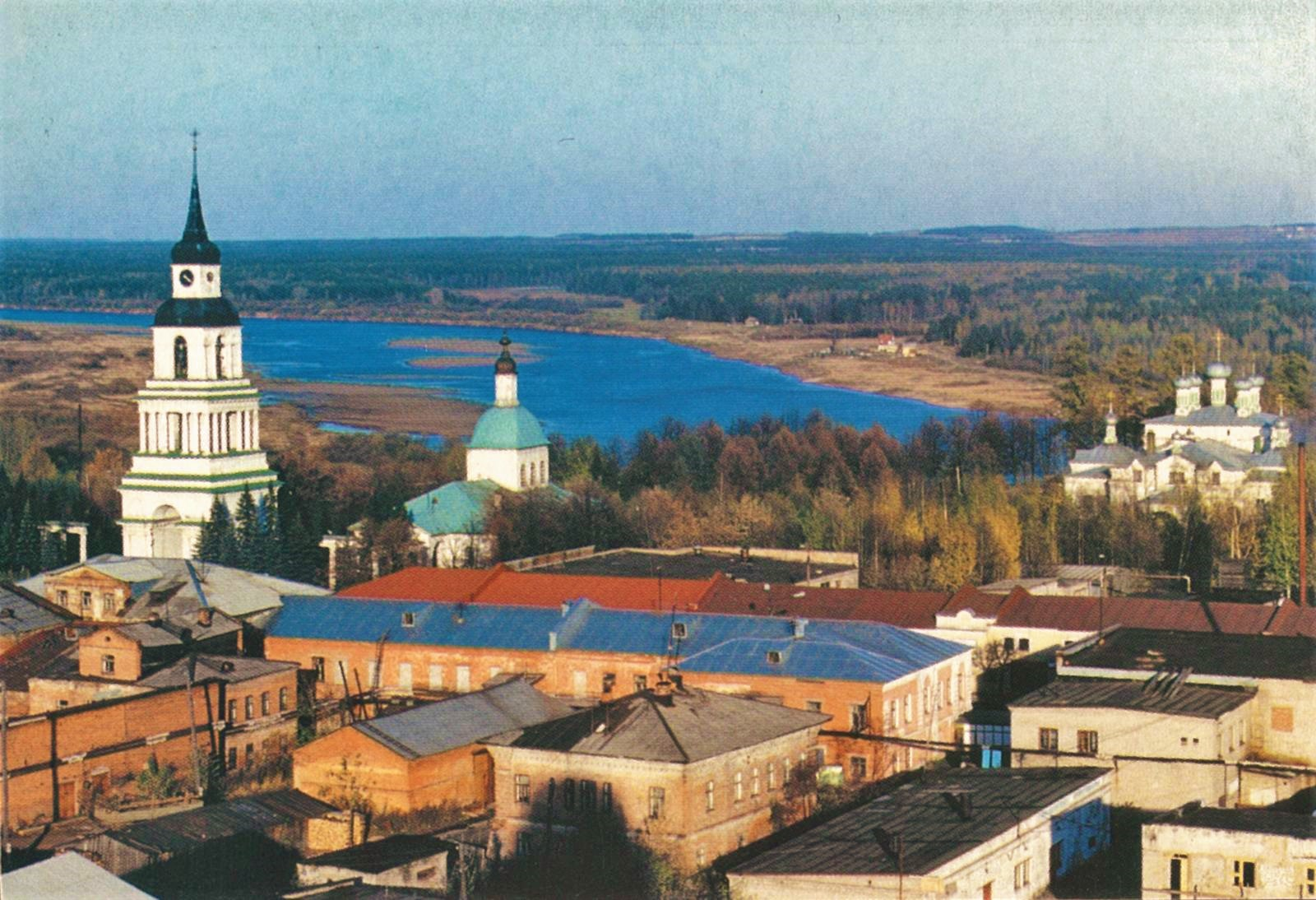
- View of Slobodskoy

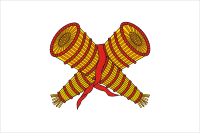
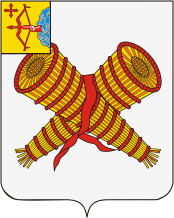
- Flag Coat of arms
- Interactive map of Slobodskoy
- Location of Slobodskoy Slobodskoy (Kirov Oblast)
- Coordinates: 58°43′15″N 50°11′06″E
- Country: Russia
- Federal subject: Kirov Oblast
- First mentioned: 1505
- Town status since: 1780
- Elevation: 140 m (460 ft)

Population (2010 Census)
  - Total: 33,981
  - Estimate (2026): 27,717 (−18.4%)

Administrative status
  - Subordinated to: Town of Slobodskoy
  - Capital of: Slobodskoy District, Town of Slobodskoy

Municipal status
  - Urban okrug: Slobodskoy Urban Okrug
  - Capital of: Slobodskoy Urban Okrug, Slobodskoy Municipal District
- Time zone: UTC+3 (MSK)
- Postal code: 613150
- OKTMO ID: 33713000001
- Website: www.slobodskoy.ru

Slobodskoy (Russian: Слободско́й) is a town in Kirov Oblast, Russia, located on the right bank of the Vyatka River, 35 kilometers (22 mi) northeast of Kirov. Population: 33,981 (2010 census); 33,477 (2002 census); 39,249 (1989 Soviet census).

== History ==
It was first mentioned in 1505 as a fortified settlement. From 1562 it was known as Slobodskoy posad (Слободско́й поса́д). It has had town status since 1780.

Slobodskoy is one of the oldest towns in Kirov Oblast. It appeared after joining Vyatka region to Moscow in 1489. For the first time Slobodskoy was mentioned in the charter of Ivan the Terrible in 1505. This year is considered to be the year of its foundation. In Slobodskoy there was the Kremlin castle, from the south it was defended by a large moat, from the east by the bank of the Vyatka and from the north by a large ravine. In the Kremlin there were three churches made of wood. At that time there were 154 houses and nearly 600 people lived here. The site of the town was chosen rather well. It was a place of forests and endless grasslands. In the forests there were a lot of animals and the rivers were full of fish.

Russians arrived in the 12th century. They were peasants who built the villages on the bank of the Vyatka River. They were from Novgorod, Ustyug, and Suzdal. The peasants were occupied with agriculture; they fed cattle, grew vegetables, and liked fishing and hunting. Slobodskoy province was connected with other provinces by highways and a river system. Natives used those routes for trading. The highway on which Slobodskoy was situated was also the way of the Russian sovereign from Moscow to far Siberia. That highway played a great role in the fate of the town. It had become an outpost and a trade center in the north of Vyatka by the beginning of the 17th century.

In the 17th century Slobodskoy became an uyezd seat with its own government. Since 1784, Slobodskoy began to be built according to the plan of Catherine the Great. In the 18th and 19th centuries, brick houses in the spirit of provincial classic appeared in the main street.

== Administrative and municipal status ==
Within the framework of administrative divisions, Slobodskoy serves as the administrative center of Slobodskoy District, even though it is not a part of it. As an administrative division, it is, together with four rural localities, incorporated separately as the Town of Slobodskoy—an administrative unit with the status equal to that of the districts. As a municipal division, the Town of Slobodskoy is incorporated as Slobodskoy Urban Okrug.
