= Slobodskoy District =

Slobodskoy District Слободской район (Russian)
- District
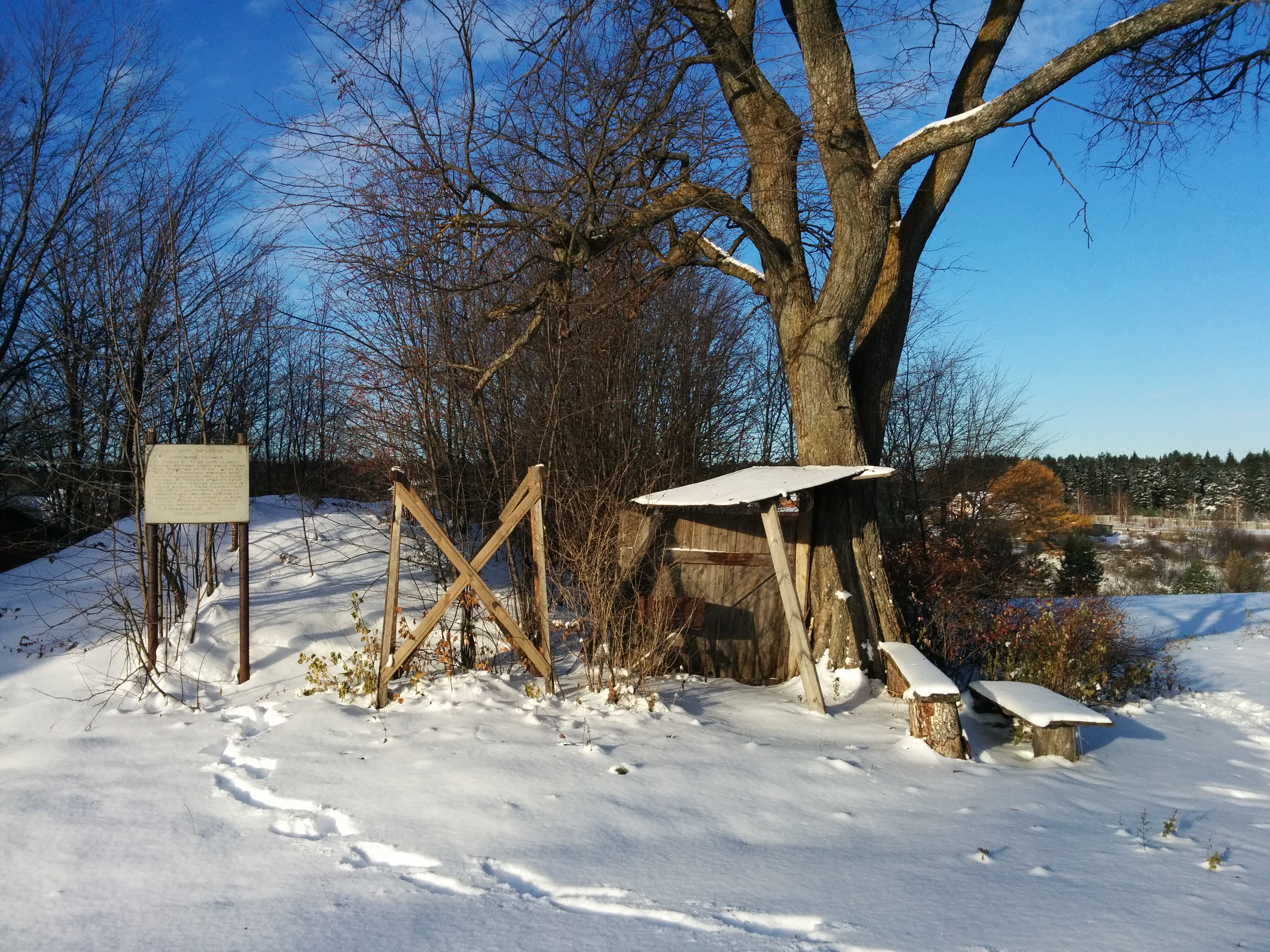
- Archaeological site, Slobodsky District

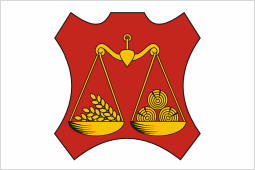
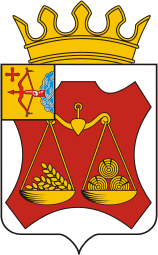
- Flag Coat of arms
- Location of Slobodskoy District in Kirov Oblast
- Coordinates: 58°43′N 50°11′E
- Country: Russia
- Federal subject: Kirov Oblast
- Established: 10 June 1929
- Administrative center: Slobodskoy

Area
  - Total: 3,790 km^{2} (1,460 sq mi)

Population (2010 Census)
  - Total: 30,174
  - Density: 7.96/km^{2} (20.6/sq mi)
  - Urban: 32.2%
  - Rural: 67.8%

Administrative structure
  - Administrative divisions: 1 Urban-type settlements, 12 Rural okrugs
  - Inhabited localities: 1 urban-type settlements, 232 rural localities

Municipal structure
  - Municipally incorporated as: Slobodskoy Municipal District
  - Municipal divisions: 1 urban settlements, 12 rural settlements
- Time zone: UTC+3 (MSK)
- OKTMO ID: 33635000
- Website: http://www.admslob.ru/

Slobodskoy District (Russian: Слободско́й райо́н) is an administrative and municipal district (raion), one of the thirty-nine in Kirov Oblast, Russia. It is located in the north of the oblast. The area of the district is 3,790 square kilometers (1,460 sq mi). Its administrative center is the town of Slobodskoy (which is not administratively a part of the district). Population: 30,174 (2010 census); 33,655 (2002 Census); 38,728 (1989 Soviet census).

== Administrative and municipal status ==
Within the framework of administrative divisions, Slobodskoy District is one of the thirty-nine in the oblast. The town of Slobodskoy serves as its administrative center, despite being incorporated separately as an administrative unit with the status equal to that of the districts.

As a municipal division, the district is incorporated as Slobodskoy Municipal District. The Town of Slobodskoy is incorporated separately from the district as Slobodskoy Urban Okrug.

== People ==
- Alexander Bakulev (1890-1967)
