= Afanasyevo, Alexandrovsky District, Vladimir Oblast =

Village in Russia

Afanasyevo Афанасьево
- Village
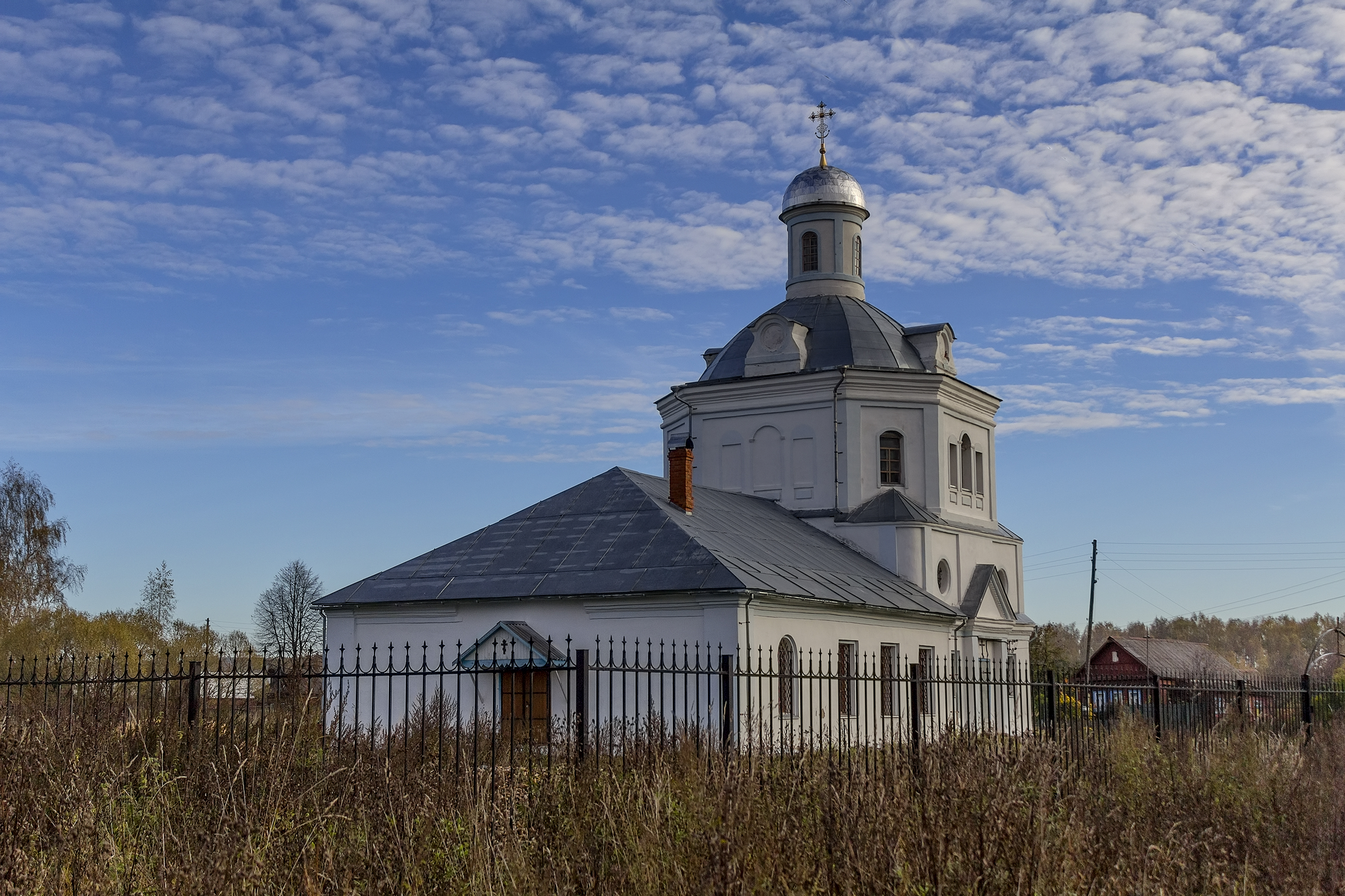
- Church of Saint John the Evangelist in Afanasyevo

- Location within Vladimir Oblast Location within Russia
- Coordinates: 56°25′N 38°41′E
- Country: Russia
- Region: Vladimir Oblast
- District: Alexandrovsky District
- Time zone: UTC+3:00

Afanasyevo (Russian: Афана́сьево) is a rural locality (a village) in Slednevskoye Rural Settlement, Alexandrovsky District, Vladimir Oblast, Russia. The population was 88 as of 2010. There are 10 streets.

== Geography ==
Afanasyevo is located 5 km north of Alexandrov (the district's administrative centre) by road. Naumovo is the nearest rural locality.
