= Afanasyevo, Sobinsky District, Vladimir Oblast =

Village in Russia

Afanasyevo Афанасьево
- Village
- Location within Vladimir Oblast Location within Russia
- Coordinates: 56°04′N 40°07′E
- Country: Russia
- Region: Vladimir Oblast
- District: Sobinsky District
- Time zone: UTC+3:00

Afanasyevo (Russian: Афана́сьево) is a rural locality (a village) in Vorshinskoye Rural Settlement, Sobinsky District, Vladimir Oblast, Russia. The population was 3 as of 2010.

== Geography ==
Afanasyevo is located 20 km northeast of Sobinka (the district's administrative centre) by road. Khryastovo is the nearest rural locality.
