= Falenskaya =

Falenskaya Фаленская
- Village
- Location within Vologda Oblast Location within Russia
- Coordinates: 59°24′N 37°13′E
- Country: Russia
- Region: Vologda Oblast
- District: Kaduysky District
- Time zone: UTC+3:00

Falenskaya (Russian: Фаленская) is a rural locality (a village) in Nikolskoye Rural Settlement, Kaduysky District, Vologda Oblast, Russia. The population was 2 as of 2002.

== Geography ==
Falenskaya is located 36 km northeast of Kaduy (the district's administrative centre) by road. Novinka is the nearest rural locality.
