= Yuryansky District =

Yuryansky District Юрьянский район (Russian)
- District
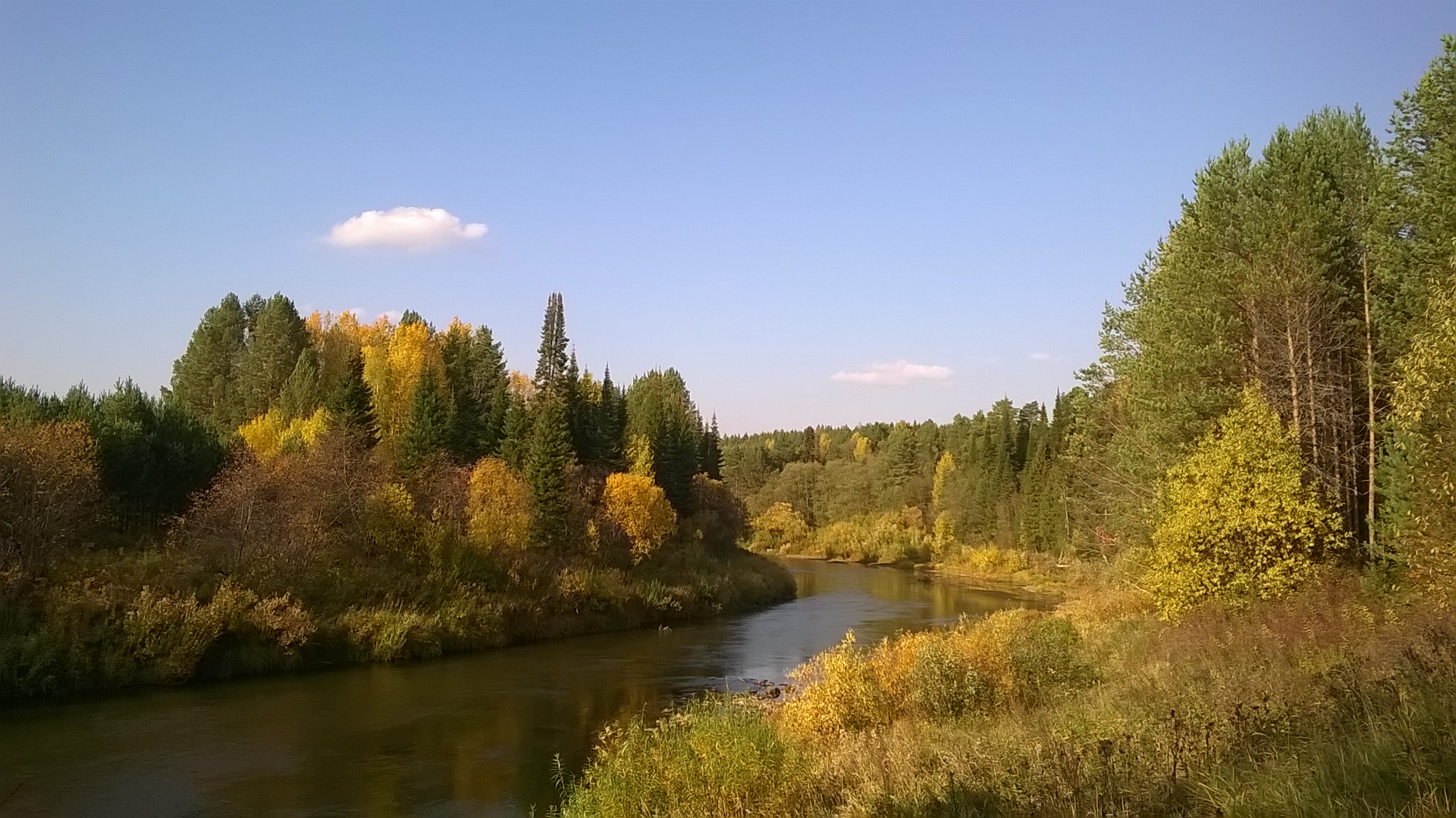
- Early autumn, Velikaya River, Yuryansky District

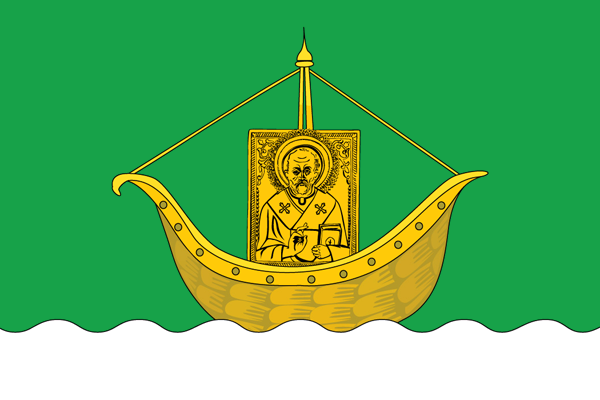
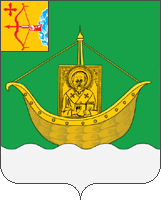
- Flag Coat of arms
- Location of Yuryansky District in Kirov Oblast
- Coordinates: 59°02′N 49°17′E
- Country: Russia
- Federal subject: Kirov Oblast
- Established: 12 January 1965
- Administrative center: Yurya

Area
  - Total: 3,031 km^{2} (1,170 sq mi)

Population (2010 Census)
  - Total: 20,128
  - Density: 6.641/km^{2} (17.20/sq mi)
  - Urban: 66.2%
  - Rural: 33.8%

Administrative structure
  - Administrative divisions: 2 Urban-type settlements, 7 Rural okrugs
  - Inhabited localities: 2 urban-type settlements, 141 rural localities

Municipal structure
  - Municipally incorporated as: Yuryansky Municipal District
  - Municipal divisions: 2 urban settlements, 7 rural settlements
- Time zone: UTC+3 (MSK)
- OKTMO ID: 33649000
- Website: http://yuriya-kirov.ru/

Yuryansky District (Russian: Юрья́нский райо́н) is an administrative and municipal district (raion), one of the thirty-nine in Kirov Oblast, Russia. It is located in the north of the oblast. The area of the district is 3,031 square kilometers (1,170 sq mi). Its administrative center is the urban locality (an urban-type settlement) of Yurya. Population: 20,128 (2010 census); 22,893 (2002 Census); 34,311 (1989 Soviet census). The population of Yurya accounts for 28.2% of the district's total population.

== People ==
- Nikolai Vasenin (1919-2014)
