= Darovskoy (urban-type settlement) =

Darovskoy Даровской
- Urban-type settlement
- Interactive map of Darovskoy
- Location of Darovskoy Darovskoy (Kirov Oblast)
- Coordinates: 58.7702°N 47.9566°E
- Country: Russia
- Federal subject: Kirov Oblast
- Administrative district: Darovskoy District
- Founded: 1717

Population (2010 Census)
  - Total: 7,125
  - Estimate (2025): 5,845 (−18%)
- Time zone: UTC+3 (MSK)
- Postal code: 612140
- OKTMO ID: 33612151051

Darovskoy (Russian: Даровской) is an urban locality (an urban-type settlement) in Darovskoy District of Kirov Oblast, Russia. Population: 7,125 (2010 census); 7,488 (2002 census); 7,224 (1989 Soviet census).
