= Nagorskoye, Vologda Oblast =

Nagorskoye Нагорское
- Village
- Location within Vologda Oblast Location within Russia
- Coordinates: 59°16′N 39°46′E
- Country: Russia
- Region: Vologda Oblast
- District: Vologodsky District
- Time zone: UTC+3:00

Nagorskoye (Russian: Нагорское) is a rural locality (a village) in Mayskoye Rural Settlement, Vologodsky District, Vologda Oblast, Russia. The population was 5 as of 2002. There are 8 streets.

== Geography ==
Nagorskoye is located 13 km northwest of Vologda (the district's administrative centre) by road. Yermolovo is the nearest rural locality.
