= Pervomaysky (urban-type settlement), Kirov Oblast =

Closed urban-type settlement in Kirov Oblast, Russia

Pervomaysky Первомайский
- Urban-type settlement
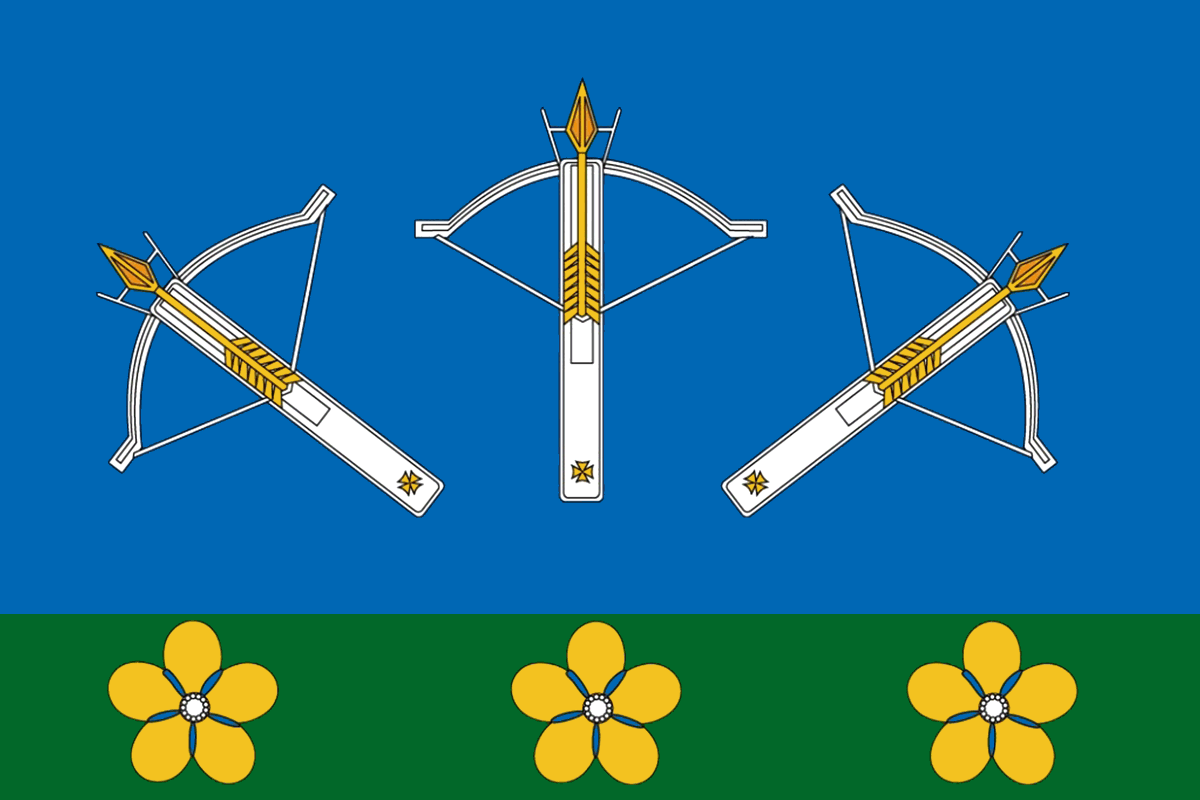
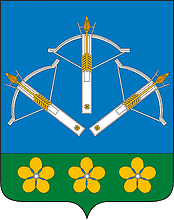
- Flag Coat of arms
- Interactive map of Pervomaysky
- Location of Pervomaysky Pervomaysky (Kirov Oblast)
- Coordinates: 59°03′56″N 49°17′08″E
- Country: Russia
- Federal subject: Kirov Oblast
- Founded: 1959

Population (2010 Census)
  - Total: 6,147
  - Estimate (2025): 4,724 (−23.1%)

Administrative status
  - Subordinated to: closed administrative-territorial formation of Pervomaysky
  - Capital of: closed administrative-territorial formation of Pervomaysky

Municipal status
  - Urban okrug: Pervomaysky Urban Okrug
  - Capital of: Pervomaysky Urban Okrug
- Time zone: UTC+3 (MSK)
- Postal code: 613648
- OKTMO ID: 33787000051

Pervomaysky (Russian: Первома́йский) is a closed urban locality (an urban-type settlement) in Kirov Oblast, Russia. Population: 6,147(2010 Census); 9,300 (2002 Census).

== Administrative and municipal status ==
Within the framework of administrative divisions, it is incorporated as the closed administrative-territorial formation of Pervomaysky—an administrative unit with the status equal to that of the districts. As a municipal division, the closed administrative-territorial formation of Pervomaysky is incorporated as Pervomaysky Urban Okrug.
