= Murashinsky District =

Murashinsky District Мурашинский район (Russian)
- District
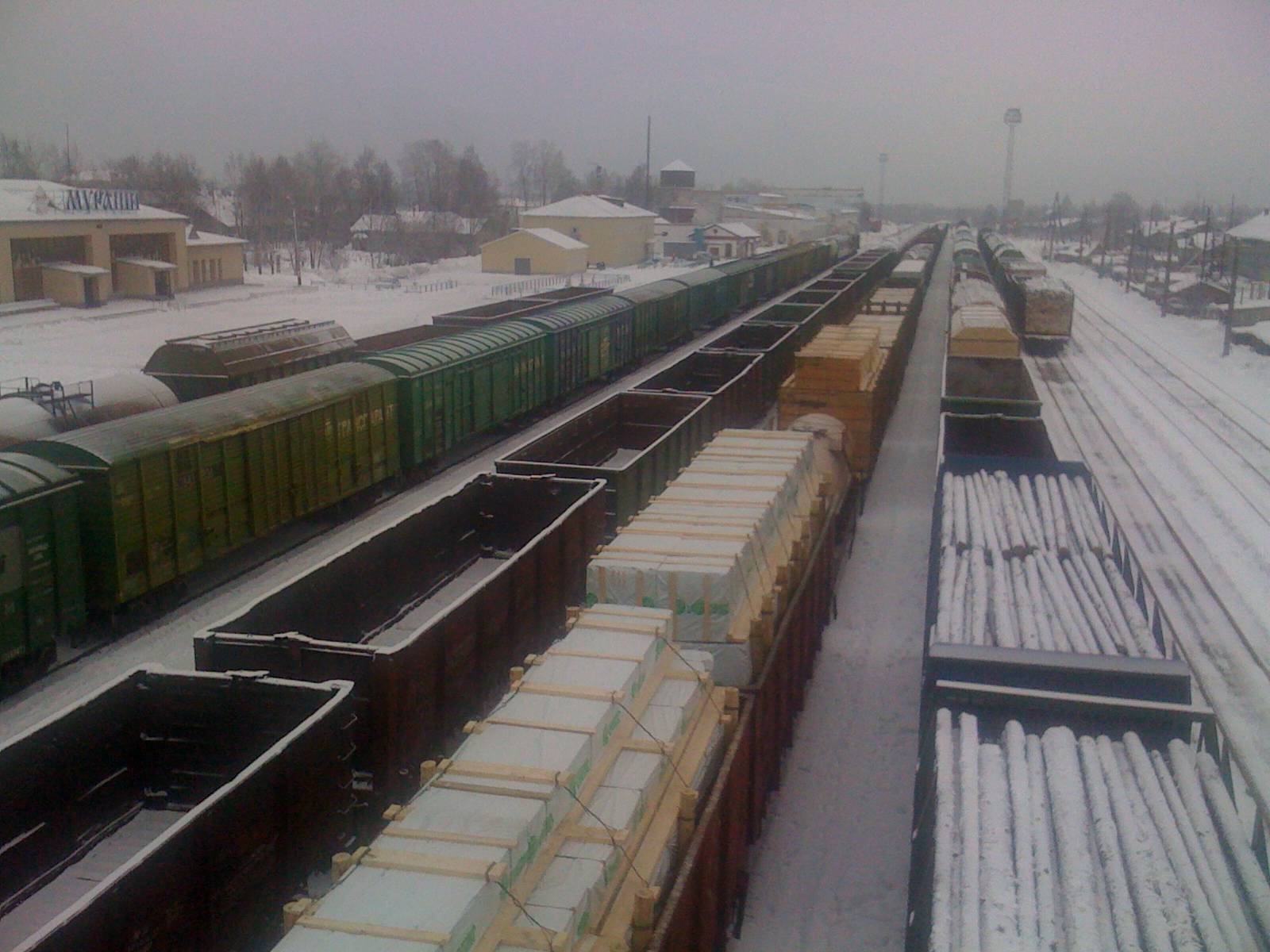
- Murashi railway station in Murashinsky District

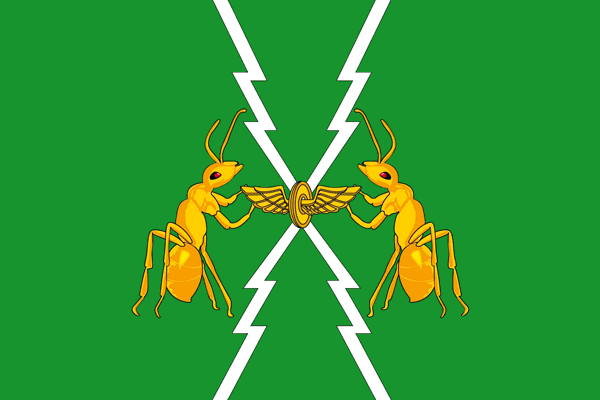
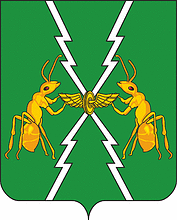
- Flag Coat of arms
- Location of Murashinsky District in Kirov Oblast
- Coordinates: 59°23′N 48°58′E
- Country: Russia
- Federal subject: Kirov Oblast
- Established: July 10, 1929
- Administrative center: Murashi

Area
  - Total: 3,415.78 km^{2} (1,318.84 sq mi)

Population (2010 Census)
  - Total: 12,905
  - Density: 3.7781/km^{2} (9.7851/sq mi)
  - Urban: 52.3%
  - Rural: 47.7%

Administrative structure
  - Administrative divisions: 1 Towns, 1 Rural okrugs
  - Inhabited localities: 1 cities/towns, 36 rural localities

Municipal structure
  - Municipally incorporated as: Murashinsky Municipal District
  - Municipal divisions: 1 urban settlements, 1 rural settlements
- Time zone: UTC+3 (MSK)
- OKTMO ID: 33624000
- Website: http://мураши-сайт.рф

Population of Murashinsky District
- 2010 Census: 12,905
- 2002 Census: 15,951
- 1989 Census: 20,518
- 1979 Census: 23,197

Murashinsky District (Russian: Мурашинский райо́н) is an administrative and municipal district (raion), one of the thirty-nine in Kirov Oblast, Russia. It is located in the north of the oblast. The area of the district is 3,415.78 square kilometers (1,318.84 sq mi). Its administrative center is the town of Murashi. As of the 2010 Census, the total population of the district was 12,905, with the population of Murashi accounting for 52.3% of that number.

== History ==
The district was established on July 10, 1929 within Vyatka Okrug of Nizhny Novgorod Krai from the parts of former Kazakovskaya and Pinyuzhanskaya Volosts of Orlovsky Uyezd. It 1934, the district became a part of Kirov Krai (which was transformed into modern Kirov Oblast in 1936).
