= Glazovsky Uyezd =

Subdivision of the Vyatka Governorate of the Russian Empire

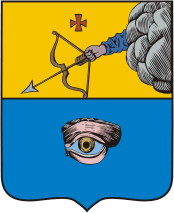
Glazov coat of arms (1781)

Glazovsky Uyezd (Глазовский уезд) was one of the subdivisions of the Vyatka Governorate of the Russian Empire. It was situated in the eastern part of the governorate. Its administrative centre was Glazov.

== Demographics ==
At the time of the Russian Empire Census of 1897, Glazovsky Uyezd had a population of 368,587. Of these, 54.7% spoke Russian, 41.6% Udmurt, 2.1% Tatar and 1.5% Komi-Permyak as their native language.
