= Darovskoy District =

Darovskoy District Даровской район
- District
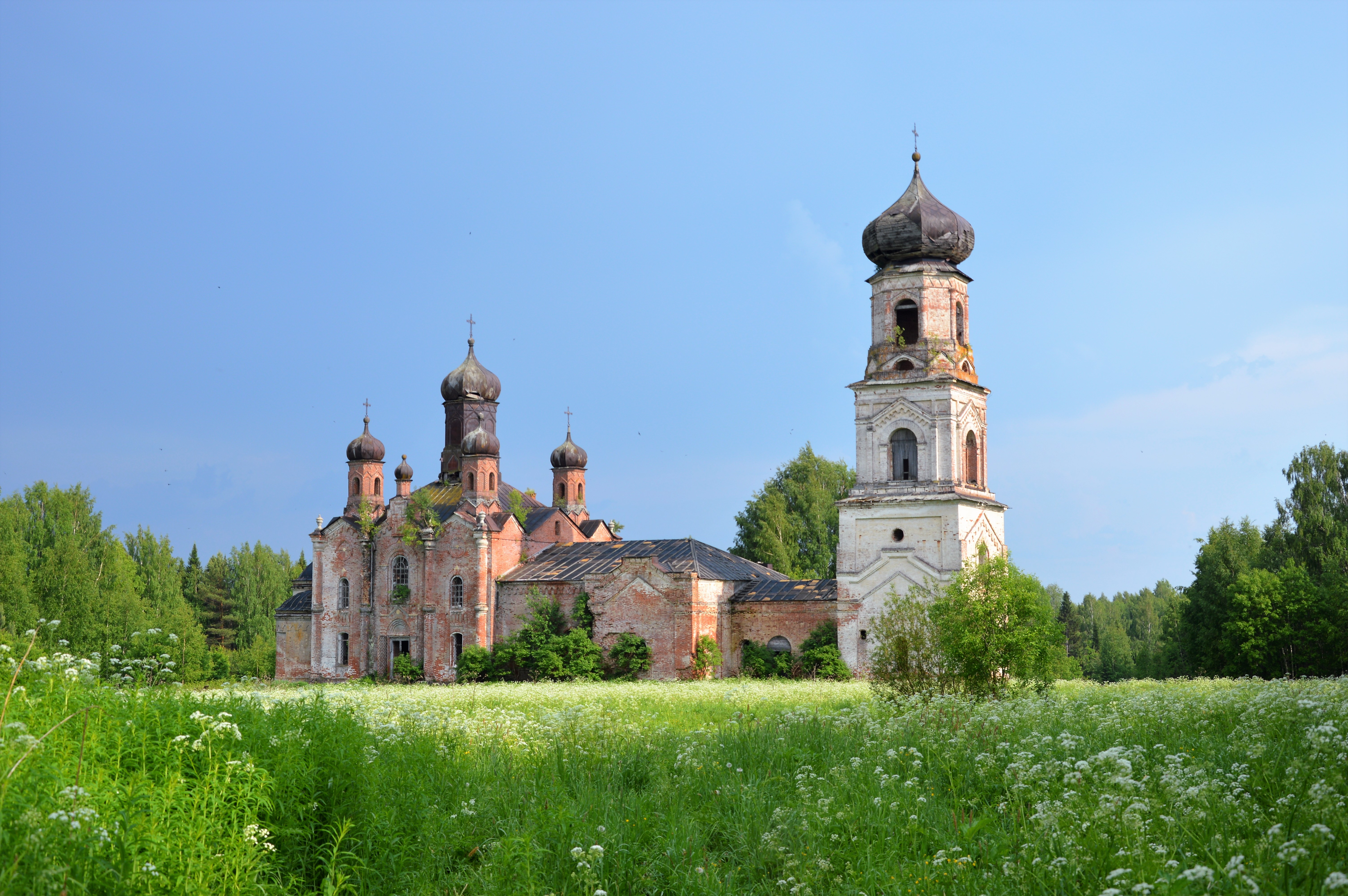

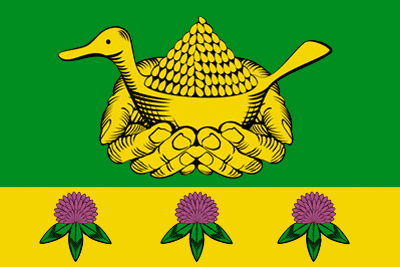
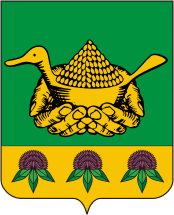
- Flag Coat of arms
- Location of Darovskoy District in Kirov Oblast
- Coordinates: 58°46′12″N 47°57′29″E
- Country: Russia
- Federal subject: Kirov Oblast
- Established: 1929
- Administrative center: Darovskoy

Area
  - Total: 3,757 km^{2} (1,451 sq mi)

Population (2010 Census)
  - Total: 11,829
  - Density: 3.149/km^{2} (8.155/sq mi)
  - Urban: 60.2%
  - Rural: 39.8%

Administrative structure
  - Administrative divisions: 1 Urban-type settlements, 5 Rural okrugs
  - Inhabited localities: 1 urban-type settlements, 111 rural localities

Municipal structure
  - Municipally incorporated as: Darovskoy Municipal District
  - Municipal divisions: 1 urban settlements, 5 rural settlements
- Time zone: UTC+3 (MSK)
- OKTMO ID: 33612000
- Website: http://admdaro.ru/

Darovskoy District (Russian: Даровской райо́н) is an administrative and municipal district (raion), one of the thirty-nine in Kirov Oblast, Russia. It is located in the west of the oblast. The area of the district is 3,757 square kilometers (1,451 sq mi). Its administrative center is the urban locality (an urban-type settlement) of Darovskoy. Population: 11,829 (2010 Census); 14,990 (2002 Census); 18,834 (1989 Soviet census). The population of the administrative center accounts for 60.2% of the district's total population.
