= Afanasyevsky District =

Afanasyevsky District Афанасьевский район (Russian)
- District
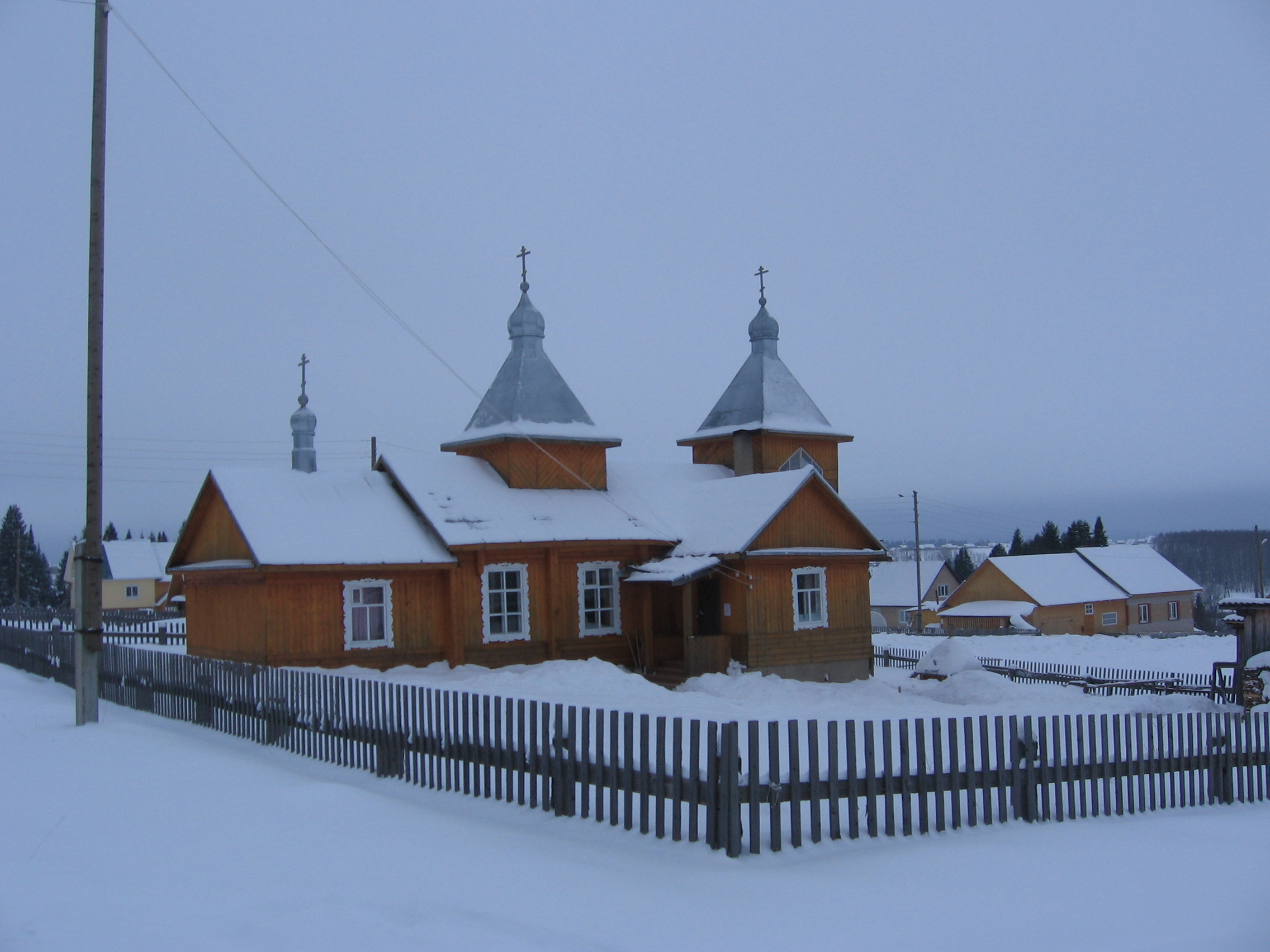
- Old Believers church in Afanasyevo

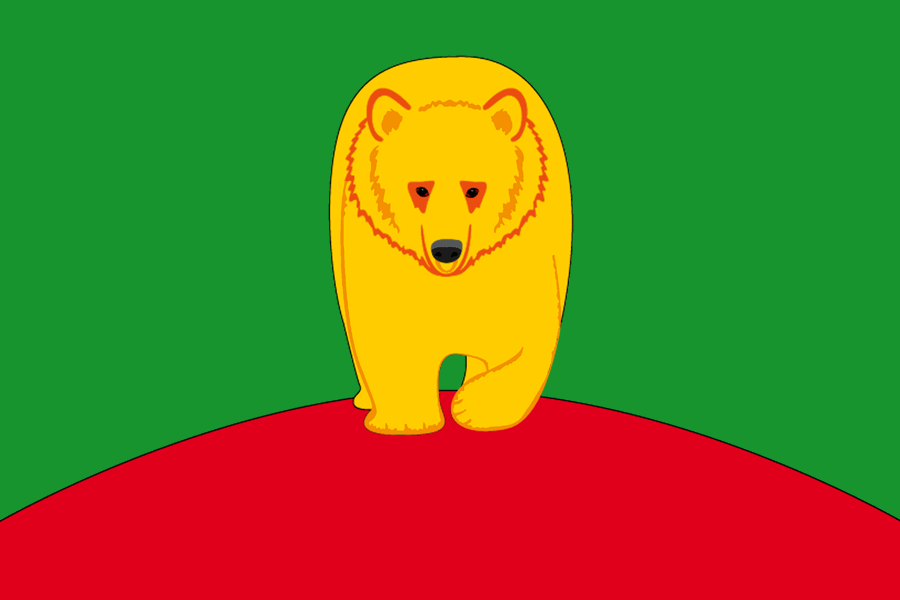
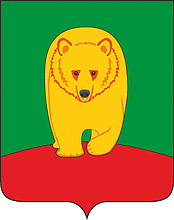
- Flag Coat of arms
- Location of Afanasyevsky District in Kirov Oblast
- Coordinates: 58°51′46″N 53°15′11″E
- Country: Russia
- Federal subject: Kirov Oblast
- Established: 10 June 1929
- Administrative center: Afanasyevo

Area
  - Total: 5,230 km^{2} (2,020 sq mi)

Population (2010 Census)
  - Total: 13,848
  - Density: 2.65/km^{2} (6.86/sq mi)
  - Urban: 24.8%
  - Rural: 75.2%

Administrative structure
  - Administrative divisions: 1 Urban-type settlements, 6 Rural okrugs
  - Inhabited localities: 1 urban-type settlements, 202 rural localities

Municipal structure
  - Municipally incorporated as: Afanasyevsky Municipal District
  - Municipal divisions: 1 urban settlements, 6 rural settlements
- Time zone: UTC+3 (MSK)
- OKTMO ID: 33603000
- Website: http://www.afanasyevo.ru/

Afanasyevsky District (Russian: Афана́сьевский райо́н) is an administrative and municipal district (raion), one of the thirty-nine in Kirov Oblast, Russia. It is located in the east of the oblast, and borders with Verkhnekamsky District in the north, Perm Oblast in the east, Udmurtia in the south, and Omutninsky District in the west. The area of the district is 5,230 square kilometers (2,020 sq mi). Its administrative center is the urban locality (an urban-type settlement) of Afanasyevo. Population: 13,848 (2010 census); 16,961 (2002 Census); 18,994 (1989 Soviet census). The population of Afanasyevo accounts for 24.8% of the district's total population.

== Geography ==
The district is located in the northeast of Kirov Oblast in a region of taiga, along the upper course of the Kama River. It is mostly located in the Upper Kama Valley with elevated topography, especially in the southern part of the district.

== History ==
The area of the district was first settled by Permians, Ugrians, and Komi peoples. It was part of Permsky Uyezd in 1607, Kaygorodsky Uyezd in 1678, and in 1708 was attached to the lands of Vyatka.

The first collective farms in the area were created in the late 1920s, beginning with the Gurinsky commune in 1928 and the large Krasny Partizan (Red Partisans) commune in Afanasyevo in 1930.

The district was established in 1929 as Zyuzdinsky District with its center in the village of Zyuzdino-Afanasyevo, including the territory of the former volosts of Afanasyevsky, Biserovsky, Gordinsky, and Georgievsky from Glazovsky Uyezd. At the time, the district included 42 village councils and had a population of approximately 40,000. In 1935 the district became Biserovsky District when its center was moved to Biserovo. It became Zyuzdinsky District again in October 1955 with the center returning to Zyuzdino-Afanasyevo, which was renamed in Afanasyevo. This resulted in the renaming of the district to Afanasyevsky District.
