= Nagorsky District =

Nagorsky District Нагорский район (Russian)
- District
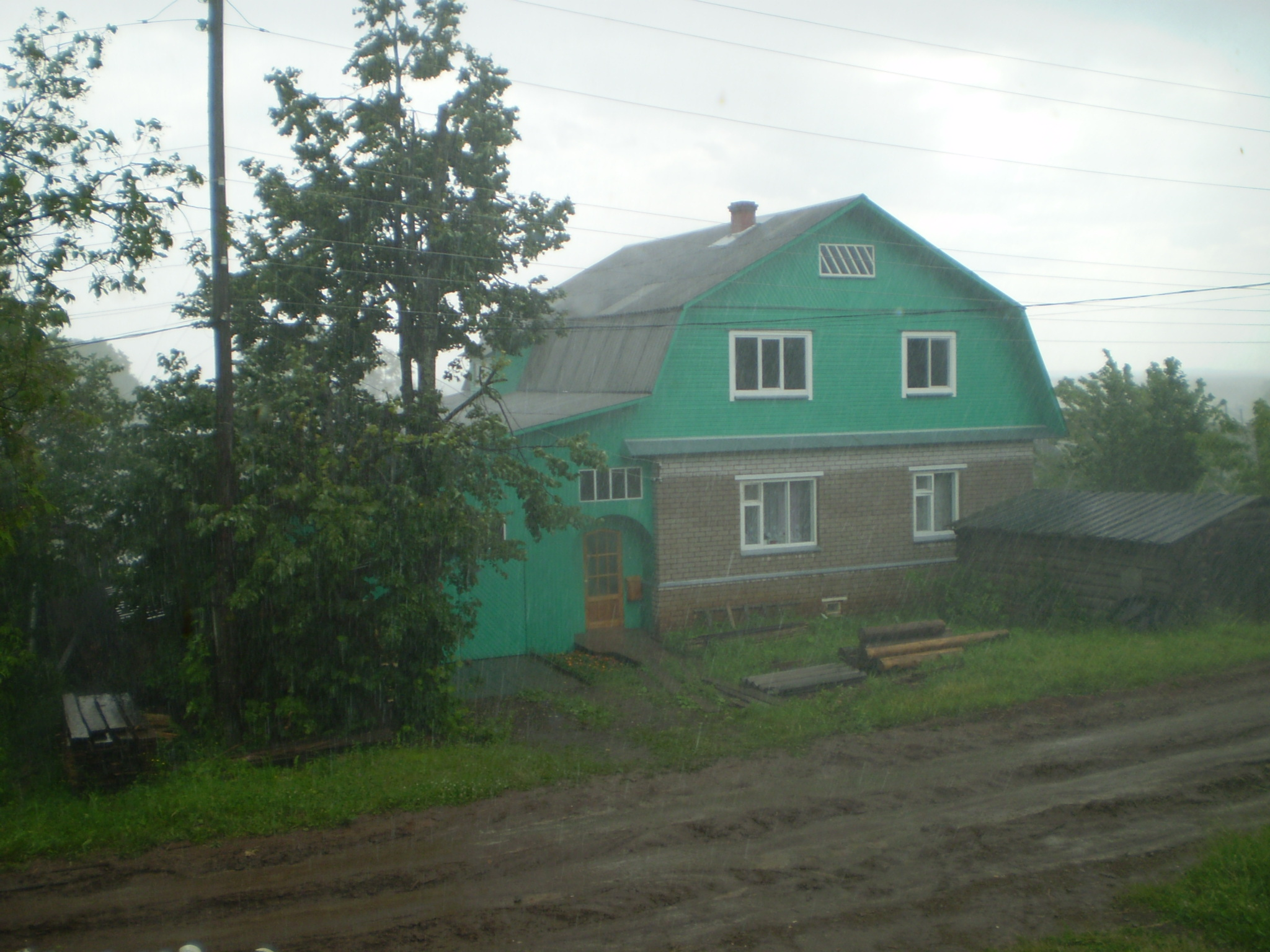
- Rainy day in Nagorsky District

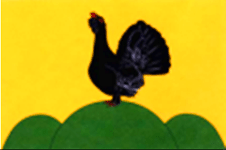
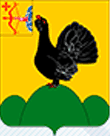
- Flag Coat of arms
- Location of Nagorsky District in Kirov Oblast
- Coordinates: 59°19′N 50°47′E
- Country: Russia
- Federal subject: Kirov Oblast
- Established: 10 July 1929
- Administrative center: Nagorsk

Area
  - Total: 7,236 km^{2} (2,794 sq mi)

Population (2010 Census)
  - Total: 10,336
  - Density: 1.428/km^{2} (3.700/sq mi)
  - Urban: 47.4%
  - Rural: 52.6%

Administrative structure
  - Administrative divisions: 1 Urban-type settlements, 5 Rural okrugs
  - Inhabited localities: 1 urban-type settlements, 65 rural localities

Municipal structure
  - Municipally incorporated as: Nagorsky Municipal District
  - Municipal divisions: 1 urban settlements, 5 rural settlements
- Time zone: UTC+3 (MSK)
- OKTMO ID: 33625000
- Website: http://nagorskadm.ru/

Nagorsky District (Russian: Наго́рский райо́н) is an administrative and municipal district (raion), one of the thirty-nine in Kirov Oblast, Russia. It is located in the north of the oblast. The area of the district is 7,236 square kilometers (2,794 sq mi). Its administrative center is the urban locality (an urban-type settlement) of Nagorsk. Population: 10,336 (2010 census); 13,186 (2002 Census); 16,577 (1989 Soviet census). The population of Nagorsk accounts for 47.4% of the district's total population.
