= Falyonsky District =

Falyonsky District Фалёнский район (Russian)
- District
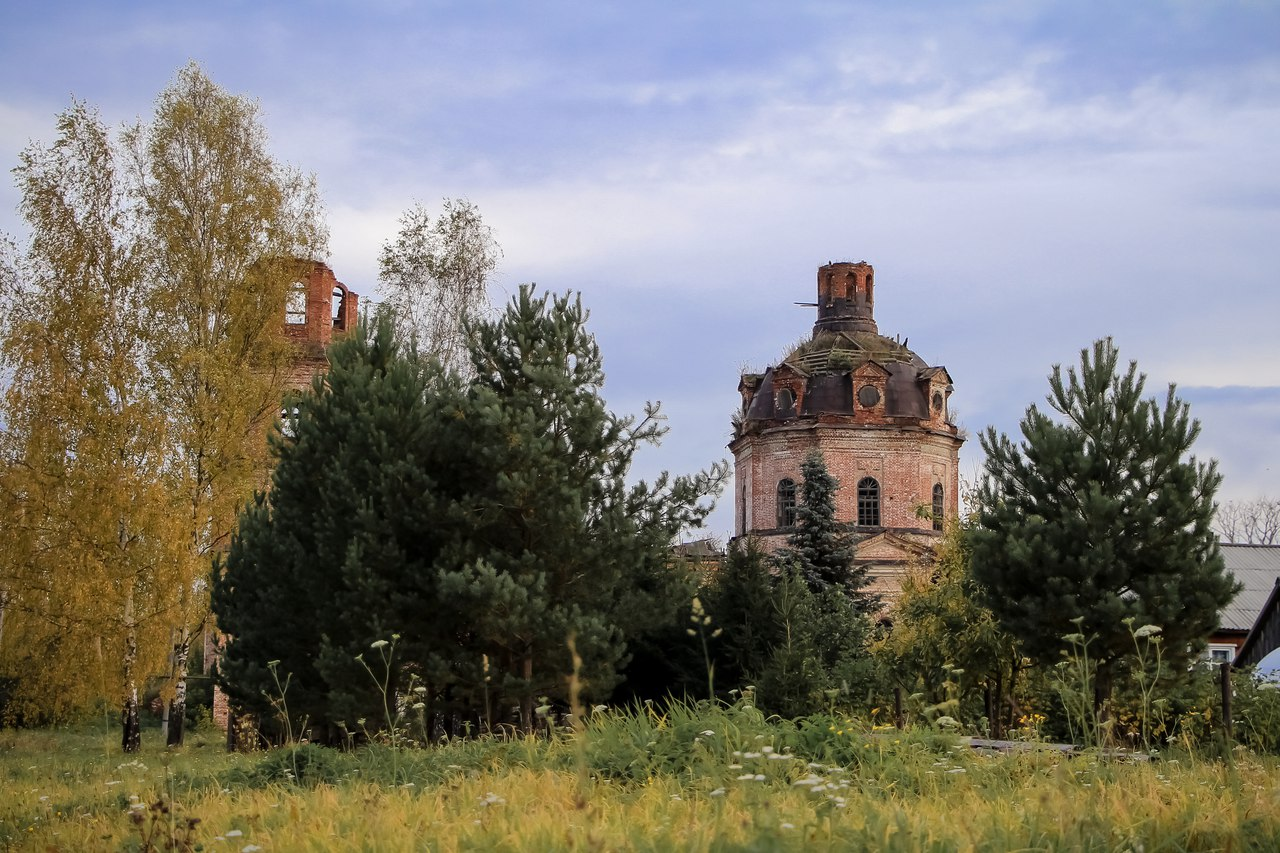
- Former Church in Falyonsky District

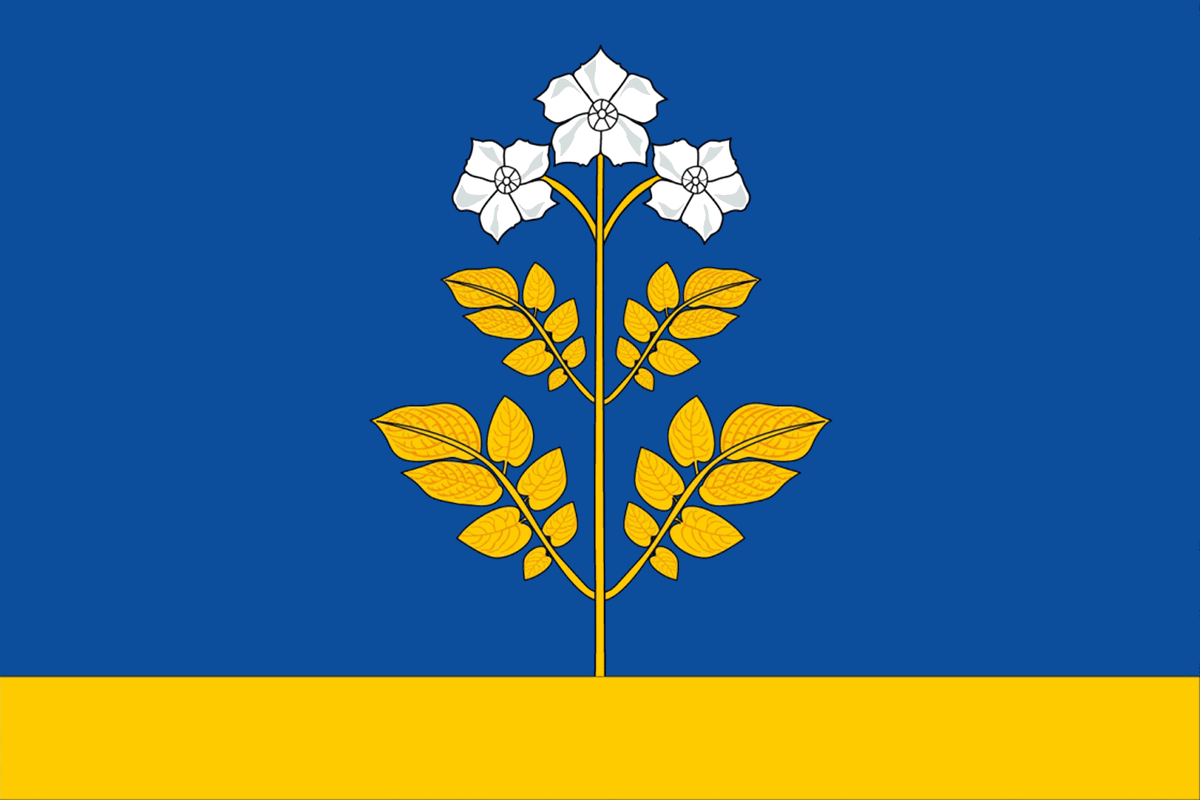
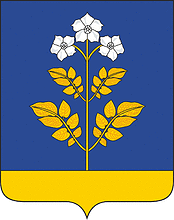
- Flag Coat of arms
- Location of Falyonsky District in Kirov Oblast
- Coordinates: 58°21′26″N 51°35′35″E
- Country: Russia
- Federal subject: Kirov Oblast
- Established: 10 June 1929
- Administrative center: Falyonki

Area
  - Total: 2,505 km^{2} (967 sq mi)

Population (2010 Census)
  - Total: 11,138
  - Density: 4.446/km^{2} (11.52/sq mi)
  - Urban: 47.2%
  - Rural: 52.8%

Administrative structure
  - Administrative divisions: 1 Urban-type settlements, 6 Rural okrugs
  - Inhabited localities: 1 urban-type settlements, 46 rural localities

Municipal structure
  - Municipally incorporated as: Falyonsky Municipal District
  - Municipal divisions: 1 urban settlements, 6 rural settlements
- Time zone: UTC+3 (MSK)
- OKTMO ID: 33643000
- Website: http://www.falenki-adm.ru/

Falyonsky District (Russian: Фалёнский райо́н) is an administrative and municipal district (raion), one of the thirty-nine in Kirov Oblast, Russia. It is located in the east of the oblast. The area of the district is 2,505 square kilometers (967 sq mi). Its administrative center is the urban locality (an urban-type settlement) of Falyonki. Population: 11,138 (2010 census); 14,713 (2002 Census); 17,756 (1989 Soviet census). The population of Falyonki accounts for 47.2% of the district's total population.

== History ==
The district was established on 10 June 1929 by a decree of the Presidium of the All-Russian Central Executive Committee (VTsIK) of the RSFSR, as part of the Vyatka Okrug within the Nizhny Novgorod Krai. Since 1934, the district was part of Kirov Krai, and from 1936 onward, part of Kirov Oblast.

In 1956, the territory of the abolished Belsky District was incorporated into the district. From 1959 to 1965, the district also included the territory of the Uninsky District.
