= Urzhumsky =

Urzhumsky (masculine), Urzhumskaya (feminine), or Urzhumskoye (neuter) may refer to:

- Urzhumsky District, a district of Kirov Oblast, Russia
- Urzhumskoye Urban Settlement, a municipal formation which the Town of Urzhum in Urzhumsky District of Kirov Oblast, Russia is incorporated as
- Urzhumskoye (rural locality), a rural locality (a selo) in Ulyanovsk Oblast, Russia
