= Urzhum =

Urzhum (Russian: Уржум) is the name of several inhabited localities in Russia.

Urban localities

- Urzhum, Urzhumsky District, Kirov Oblast, a town in Urzhumsky District of Kirov Oblast; 57°7′N 50°0′E

Rural localities

- Urzhum, Altai Krai, a selo in Dubrovsky Selsoviet of Aleysky District in Altai Krai; 52°14′N 83°2′E
- Urzhum, Sanchursky District, Kirov Oblast, a village in Korlyakovsky Rural Okrug of Sanchursky District in Kirov Oblast; 57°7′N 46°58′E
- Urzhum, Kostroma Oblast, a village in Kotkishevskoye Settlement of Neysky District in Kostroma Oblast; 58°15′N 43°46′E
