= Uyvayka =

- Native name: Уйвайка, Увайка (Russian)

Location
- Country: Russia

Physical characteristics
- Mouth: Uva
  - coordinates: 57.1886°N 52.5694°E
- Length: 15 km (9.3 mi)
- Basin size: 70 km^{2} (27 sq mi)

Basin features
- Progression: Uva→ Vala→ Kilmez→ Vyatka→ Kama→ Volga→ Caspian Sea

The Uyvayka (Russian: Уйвайка, also: Увайка - Uvayka) is a river in Udmurtia, Russia, which flows through the Yakshur-Bodyinsky and Uvinsky Districts. The mouth of the river is 99 km along the right bank of the Uva. The length of the river is 15 km, and the catchment area is 69.6 km^{2}.
