= Belokholunitsky =

Belokholunitsky (masculine), Belokholunitskaya (feminine), or Belokholunitskoye (neuter) may refer to:

- Belokholunitsky District, a district of Kirov Oblast, Russia
- Belokholunitskoye Urban Settlement, a municipal formation which the Town of Belaya Kholunitsa in Belokholunitsky District of Kirov Oblast, Russia is incorporated as
