= Urzhumka =

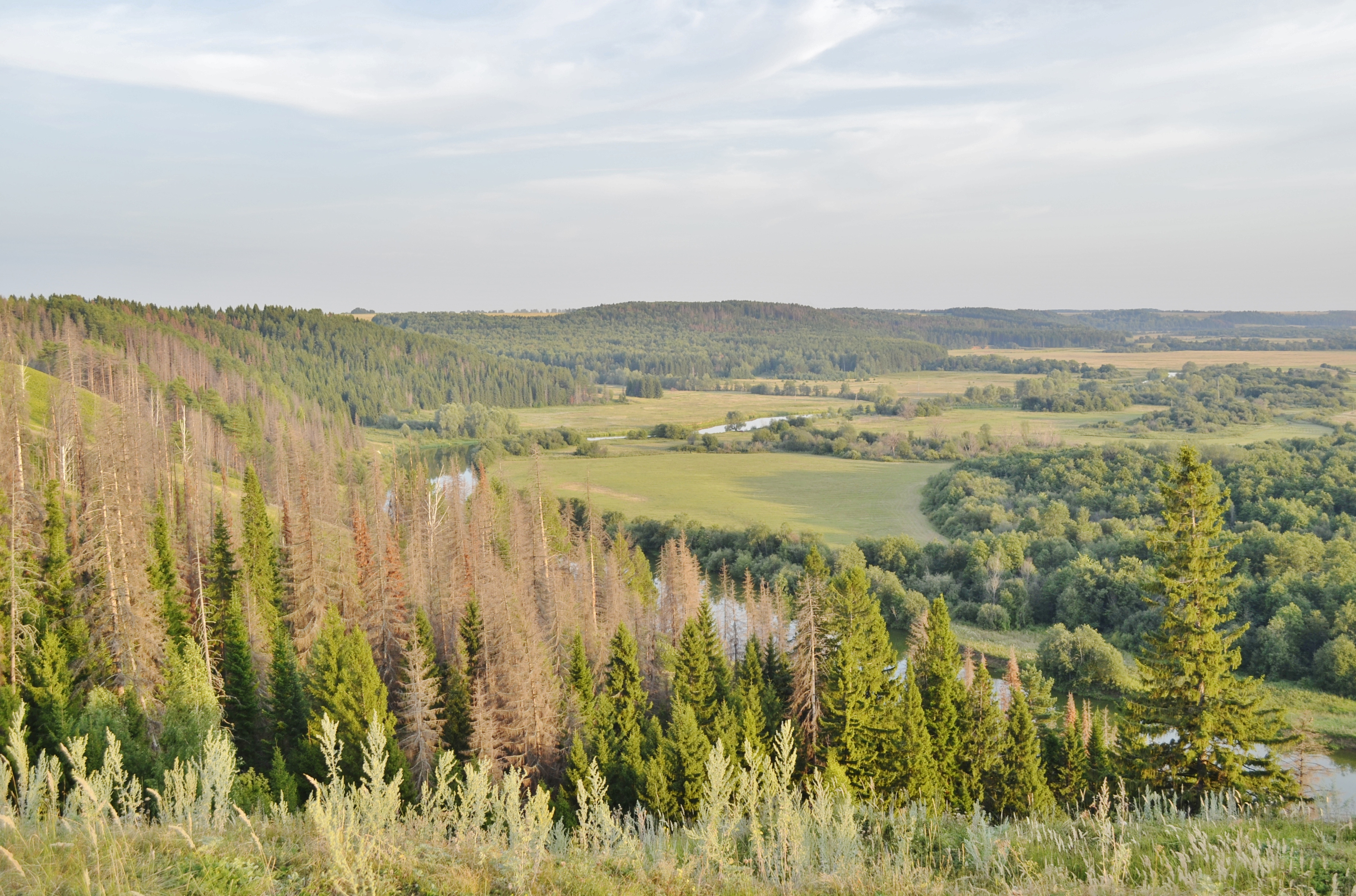
- Native name: Уржумка (Russian)

Location
- Country: Russia

Physical characteristics
- Source
  - elevation: 124 m (407 ft)
- Mouth: Vyatka
  - coordinates: 57°09′15″N 50°07′23″E
  - elevation: 68.4 m (224 ft)
- Length: 109 km (68 mi)
- Basin size: 1,780 km^{2} (690 sq mi)

Basin features
- Progression: Vyatka→ Kama→ Volga→ Caspian Sea

The Urzhumka (Russian: Уржумка) is a river in Mari-Tureksky District of the Republic of Mari El and in Urzhumsky District of Kirov Oblast in Russia. It is a right tributary of the Vyatka. It is 109 kilometres (68 mi) long, and has a basin covering 1,780 square kilometres (690 sq mi). Its main tributaries are the Shoba (93 km), Shumba (87 km), Nolya (69 km), Ashlanka (65 km), Pilinka (52 km), Ashlanka (33 km), Masarinka (87 km), and the Ireka (63 km). The town of Urzhum on the left bank of the Urzhumka is about 10 kilometres (6.2 mi) from its mouth.

The source of the Urzhumka is in the woods in the western part of Mari-Tureksky District. The river flows east and in the selo of Bolshoye Oparino turns northeast. The Ireka, a right tributary of the Urzhumka, in the lower course marks the border between Mari El and Kirov Oblast. In Kirov Oblast, the Urzhumka gradually turns north, accepts the Ashlanka from the left, and turns east. In the selo of Shevnino it turns north, passes through the town of Urzhum, and turns east. The mouth of the Urzhumka is downstream of the selo of Tsepochkino.

The river basin of the Urzhumka includes the central part of Mari-Tureksky District, the western part of Urzhumsky District, as well as areas in the east of Paranginsky District of Mari El.
