= Nemda =

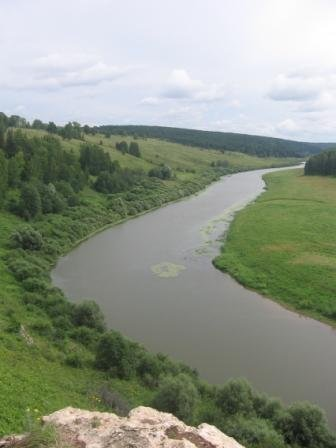
- Native name: Немда (Russian)

Location
- Country: Russia

Physical characteristics
- Mouth: Pizhma
  - coordinates: 57°35′07″N 48°55′18″E
- Length: 162 km (101 mi)
- Basin size: 3,780 km^{2} (1,460 sq mi)

Basin features
- Progression: Pizhma→ Vyatka→ Kama→ Volga→ Caspian Sea

The Nemda (Russian: Немда) is a river in Mari El and Kirov Oblast in Russia, a right tributary of the Pizhma. The length of the river is 162 km, the area of its basin is 3,780 km². The Nemda freezes up in mid-November and remains icebound until mid-April.
