= Kilmez =

Kilmez (Russian: Кильмезь) may refer to several places in Russia:

- Kilmez (river), a tributary of the Vyatka in Udmurtia and Kirov Oblast
- Kilmez, Kirov Oblast, an urban-type settlement in Kilmezsky District of Kirov Oblast
- Kilmez, Udmurt Republic, a selo in Kilmezsky Selsoviet of Syumsinsky District of Udmurtia
