= Pizhma =

Pizhma (Russian: Пижма) is the name of several places in Russia:

Urban localities

- Pizhma, Nizhny Novgorod Oblast, a work settlement in Tonshayevsky District of Nizhny Novgorod Oblast

Rural localities

- Pizhma, Leningrad Oblast, a village in Kobrinskoye Settlement Municipal Formation of Gatchinsky District of Leningrad Oblast
- Pizhma, Mari El Republic, a village in Pizhmensky Rural Okrug of Medvedevsky District of the Mari El Republic

Rivers

- Pizhma (Pechora), a tributary of the Pechora in Komi Republic
- Pizhma (Vyatka), a tributary of the Vyatka in Nizhny Novgorod and Kirov Oblasts
