= Kotly =

Kotly (Russian: Котлы) is the name of several rural localities in Russia.

== Modern localities ==
- Kotly (settlement at the railway station), Leningrad Oblast, a settlement at the railway station in Kotelskoye Settlement Municipal Formation of Kingiseppsky District in Leningrad Oblast; 59°37′N 28°46′E
- Kotly, Leningrad Oblast (village), a village in Kotelskoye Settlement Municipal Formation of Kingiseppsky District in Leningrad Oblast; 59°37′N 28°46′E
- Kotly, Oryol Oblast, a village in Krasnensky Selsoviet of Zalegoshchensky District in Oryol Oblast; 52°51′N 36°49′E

== Alternative names ==
- Kotly, alternative name of Kotelki, a village in Bogdanovsky Rural Okrug of Urzhumsky District in Kirov Oblast; 57°08′N 49°58′E

== Abolished localities ==
- Kotly, Moscow, a former rural locality whose territory is now located in southern Moscow
