= Kotelnich =

Town in Kirov Oblast, Russia

Kotelnich Котельнич Кäкшäр (Mari)
- Town
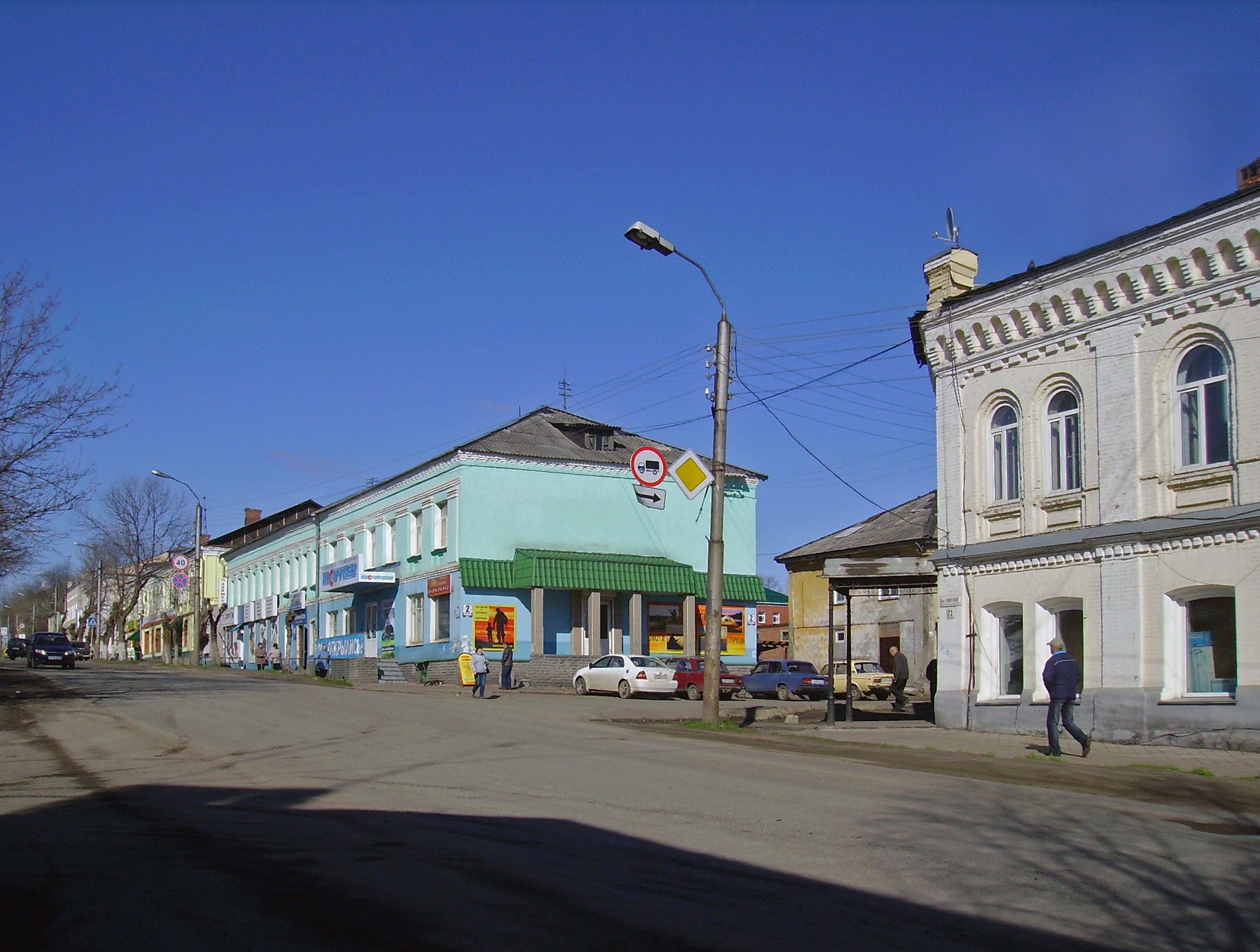
- Kotelnich

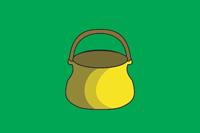
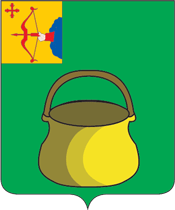
- Flag Coat of arms
- Interactive map of Kotelnich
- Location of Kotelnich Kotelnich (Kirov Oblast)
- Coordinates: 58°18′28″N 48°19′05″E
- Country: Russia
- Federal subject: Kirov Oblast
- First mentioned: 1143
- Town status since: 1780
- Elevation: 120 m (390 ft)

Population (2010 Census)
  - Total: 24,979
  - Estimate (2021): 20,144 (−19.4%)

Administrative status
  - Subordinated to: Town of Kotelnich
  - Capital of: Kotelnichsky District, Town of Kotelnich

Municipal status
  - Urban okrug: Kotelnich Urban Okrug
  - Capital of: Kotelnich Urban Okrug, Kotelnichsky Municipal District
- Time zone: UTC+3 (MSK)
- Postal code: 612600–612607
- OKTMO ID: 33710000001
- Website: kotelnich-omv.ru

Kotelnich (Russian: Коте́льнич; Mari: Кäкшäр, romanized: Käkšär) is a river port town in Kirov Oblast, Russia, located on the right bank of the Vyatka River near its confluence with the Moloma, along the route of the Trans-Siberian Railway, 124 kilometers (77 mi) southwest of Kirov. Population: 24,979 (2010 census); 28,245 (2002 census); 36,841 (1989 Soviet census).

== History ==
The locality of Koksharov (Кокшаров) was first mentioned in 1143 as a Mari town. In 1182, it was occupied by Russians and renamed Kotelnich, from the word kotel (now kotlovina), meaning "hollow", "depression". It was granted town status in 1780, and then became one of the main settlements of the Vyatka Land.

The city of Kotelnich is well known all over Russia and in some foreign countries due to it being a location of ancient fossil vertebrates – the pareiasaurus.

=== 12th to 16th centuries ===
Ancient literary monuments and archaeological excavations have demonstrated that the town was founded near the end of the 12th century, at which time it was inhabited by the Maris (Cheremis), according to P. I. Rychkov and N. M. Karamzin. The first documents that prove the city status of Kotelnich date from the middle of the fifteenth century. For a long time the Vyatka region was a strong antagonist of Moscow and its attempts to consolidate all the Russian lands, but eventually resistance was broken, and Kotelnich was conquered in 1459 together with many other towns of the region. By 1489 its rebellious population was resettled to distant places and the city itself became an ordinary fortress on the northeastern border of the Grand Duchy of Moscow, helping protect the rich northern lands from ruinous raids by Tatars. In 1542 a troop of 4,000 Tatars was defeated near Kotelnich.

In the middle of the 16th century, the region was divided into four parts, with Kotelnich as the head of one part. In 1558 the system of vice-regency was liquidated and much power was given to local group representative bodies. At the end of the century a Siberian Route was built that passed through Kotelnich. A listing conducted in 1595 revealed a population of 430 citizens.

=== 17th to 19th century ===
The Time of Troubles was a significant period for the town; it was captured by armed bands that devastated churches, raped women, and turned Kotelnich into a local center of the uprising for the "Tsar Dmitri". After being liberated in December 1609, Kotelnich fell into decay; it became the smallest town in the Vyatka region. During the next forty years its economy was restored, which led to the opening of a large fair called Alexeyevskaya, in honor of Tsar Alexey Mikhaylovich). In 1654, the population was to be five times more than in 1629 because of an increasing number of new settlers lured by an abundance of unoccupied land, and also due to the colonization activity of monasteries. This development was interrupted by an epidemic of mortal ulcers in 1658. Eventually, in 1686, Kotelnich was completely burnt down.

In the 18th century its population and economy grew slowly, restrained by recruit enrollment and money exactions for the building of Saint Petersburg and attendant projects. The churches were rebuilt despite the prohibition on stone construction. In the days of Catherine the Great, Kotelnich became a center of a district that remains today. It also received an emblem and self-government rights, including elections for a city chief and formation of a local council (duma). By 1795 its population was over one thousand people for the first time (448 men and 606 women). Kotelnich began to develop as a connecting link between Perm, Kazan, Kostroma and Vyatka. During this time the first post office, a small public college with 30 pupils, a city hospital for 10 patients, and a private pharmacy were opened.

During the 19th century the fair in Kotelnich acquired considerable interregional significance. In various years it was included in the best ten fairs in Russia due to a great volume of sales. The main products sold in the market were horses and sewing machines. However, the popularity of the fair didn't stimulate internal trade or productive work in Kotelnich. The town earned sufficient money from leasing warehouses and trade spaces. By the end of the century (1897) the population of the town had increased to 4,240 people and the territory to 1.8 km^{2}.

=== 20th century ===
In the 20th century Kotelnich developed as a transport junction. A main railway from Saint Petersburg to Vyatka went through Kotelnich in 1902–1905 when the bridge across the river was built. As a result, the Alexeyevskaya fair lost its significant role. The beginning of the century was also marked by the appearance of a water supply, 36 cabmen, oil lamps on the streets, telephone communication, and 22 prostitutes.

Workers and soldiers in Kotelnich joined the protest actions during World War I. Disorder of 6,000 mobilized citizens was suppressed brutally, with 10 people killed and 12 injured. Bolshevik power in 1917 came to Kotelnich comparatively late, by armed means. During the Civil War, Kotelnich passed from hand to hand many times. A terrible fire in 1926 destroyed two-thirds of the town and left more than 7,000 people homeless. Kotelnich very nearly became a small rural settlement after that; the local legislative committee was forced to persuade the government of the republic to keep its city status and to rebuild what was destroyed.

In 1926 a fair was conducted for the last time, and most trade businesses were closed. During the next 10 years there were built several small and middle-size industrial enterprises such as building materials factories and sawing and brick plants. The council and Red Army deputies were lax in the execution of their functions, which led to frequent changes of local leadership. Kotelnich was often left without electricity because the capacity of the local electric power station was low. Delivery of foodstuffs was reduced, and the death rate grew quickly. Many people refused to work, and 239 were subjected to the Great Purge for political reasons by 1952 (more than half of them were shot). Kotelnich became a place of exile for many priests.

From July 1941 it was an evacuation point for thousands of people from northwestern Russia. By February 1943 the population of the town had increased to 32,500. There wasn't much space to settle all the evacuees, and many families from the western regions were lodged with local ones. Four evacuation hospitals were organized, and 50,000 fighters recovered there and later returned to the battlefront. In the battles of World War II, 654 natives of Kotelnich perished.

The first postwar years were difficult. A crisis was experienced in production and dwelling. It was not until the late sixties that many plants were reconstructed or newly built. The biggest is Micrometer, a ferroconcrete and furniture plant. By the 1980s each citizen had a little more than 13 square meters of dwelling space. Several schools, colleges, and cultural establishments appeared at that time.

The Hungarian POW András Toma was transferred in January 1947 to a psychiatric hospital in Kotelnich. Since those who were in hospitals were deleted from the lists of prisoners of war, Toma was lost to Hungarian authorities. He was declared dead in 1954. He lived under the name András Tamás (Андраш Тамаш). A Czech linguist identified him as Hungarian, and on August 11, 2000, Toma arrived back to Hungary where his family was identified with the help of DNA investigation. Toma was promoted to sergeant major by the Minister of Defense, and since his service was continuous, his salary was paid. 74-year-old Toma moved in with his half-sister Anna who cared for him until his death. He was probably the last prisoner of war from the Second World War to be repatriated.

==== Fossil resource ====
Pareiasaurus – is a large reptile with spurs in the buccal region of the skull. These animals grew to about 3 meters long and inhabited Europe, South Africa, and Asia 250-260 million years ago. The strip of the Vyatka's right bank on which Kotelnich stands is a part of a pareiasaur remains site, one of the largest in the world. This landmark is located on the right steep bank of the Vyatka River and covers 30 km from Kotelnich to Vishkil. The best view on the landmark opens to the passengers of the train going across Vyatka near Kotelnich.

The first excavation works were performed in 1933, then in 1948 and 1949. Full-scale research started in the late 1980s-early 1990s. Specialists prove the uniqueness of the landmark, the only comparable sight being Karoo, South Africa. Annually Russian and foreign scientists find skeleton fragments and bones of ancient animals of the Permian period of Palaeozoic era, Triassic and Jurassic periods of Mesozoic era.

Paleontological museum of Kotelnich was opened in 1994. It exhibits both the findings from the excavation site in Kotelnich, and the replicas of the most famous findings from Germany, the US, and Mongolia. The exposition of the museum shows the global geological and evolution processes that took place on Earth about 200 million years ago. The workers of the museum organized a mobile exposition – “Vyatka Dinosaurs”, which was displayed to people in many Russian cities. In summer, when the level of water in Vyatka goes down, Paleontological Museum of Kotelnich takes tourists on a grasping trip to the excavation site where everyone will find a piece for his own archeological collection.

=== 21st century ===
==== 2024 oil infrastructure attack ====
The Rosrezerves' Zenit oil depot in Kotelnich—a large petroleum tank farm installation of the Russian State Reserve—was attacked and set ablaze by a Ukrainian Armed Forces drone strike on 28 August 2024, during the Russian invasion of Ukraine. This was the first attack on the region since the start of hostilities, and is deep in inland Russia, over 1200 km from the Ukrainian border. Ukrainian General Staff officially acknowledged the attack the next day. Kirov Oblast Governor Alexander Sokolov said that "Russian air defenses shot down two drones while three others "fell" and started a fire near the Zenit facility.

== Administrative and municipal status ==
Within the framework of administrative divisions, Kotelnich serves as the administrative center of Kotelnichsky District, even though it is not a part of it. As an administrative division, it is incorporated separately as the Town of Kotelnich—an administrative unit with the status equal to that of the districts. As a municipal division, the Town of Kotelnich is incorporated as Kotelnich Urban Okrug.

== Gallery ==
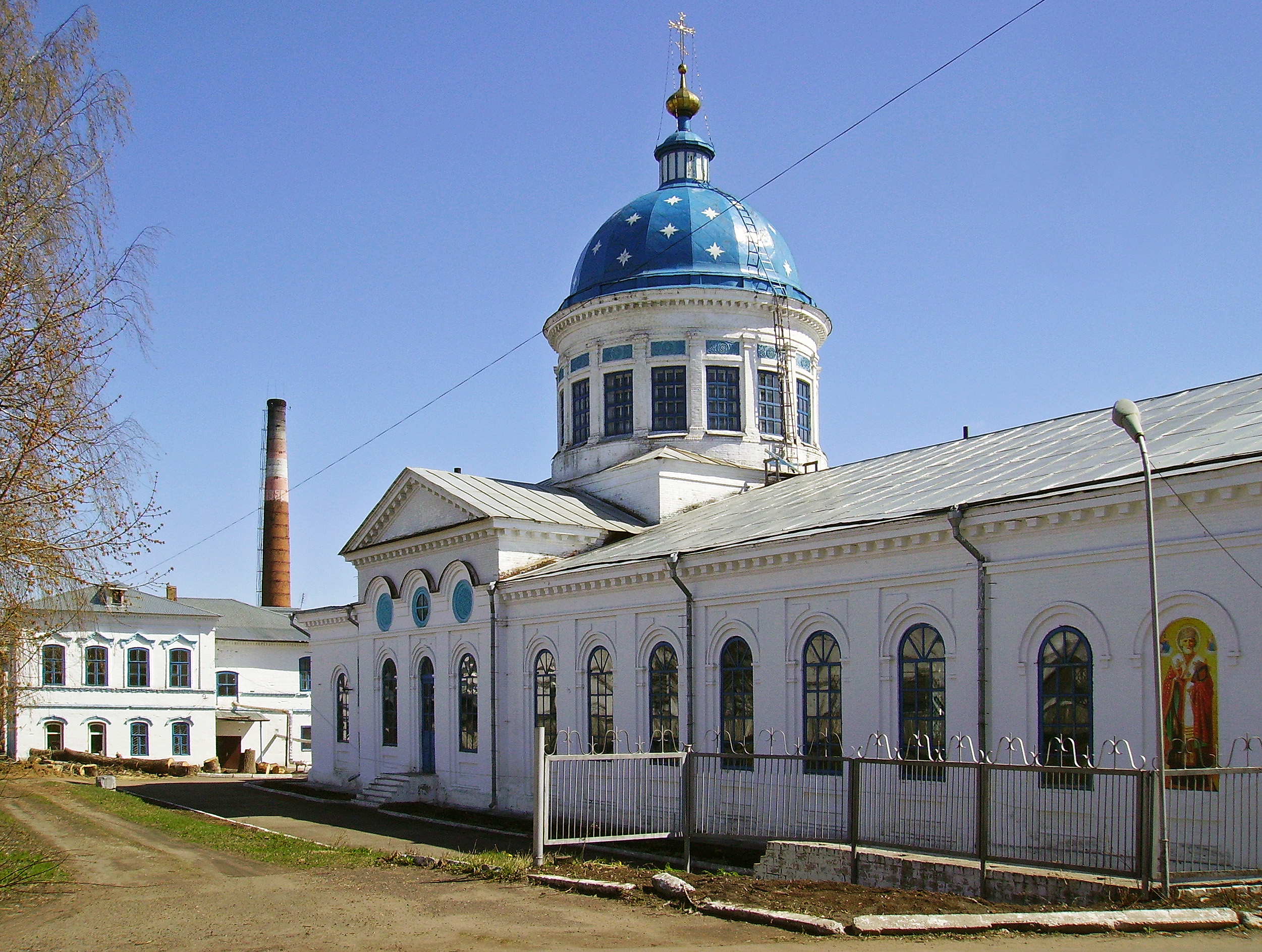
St. Nicholas Church

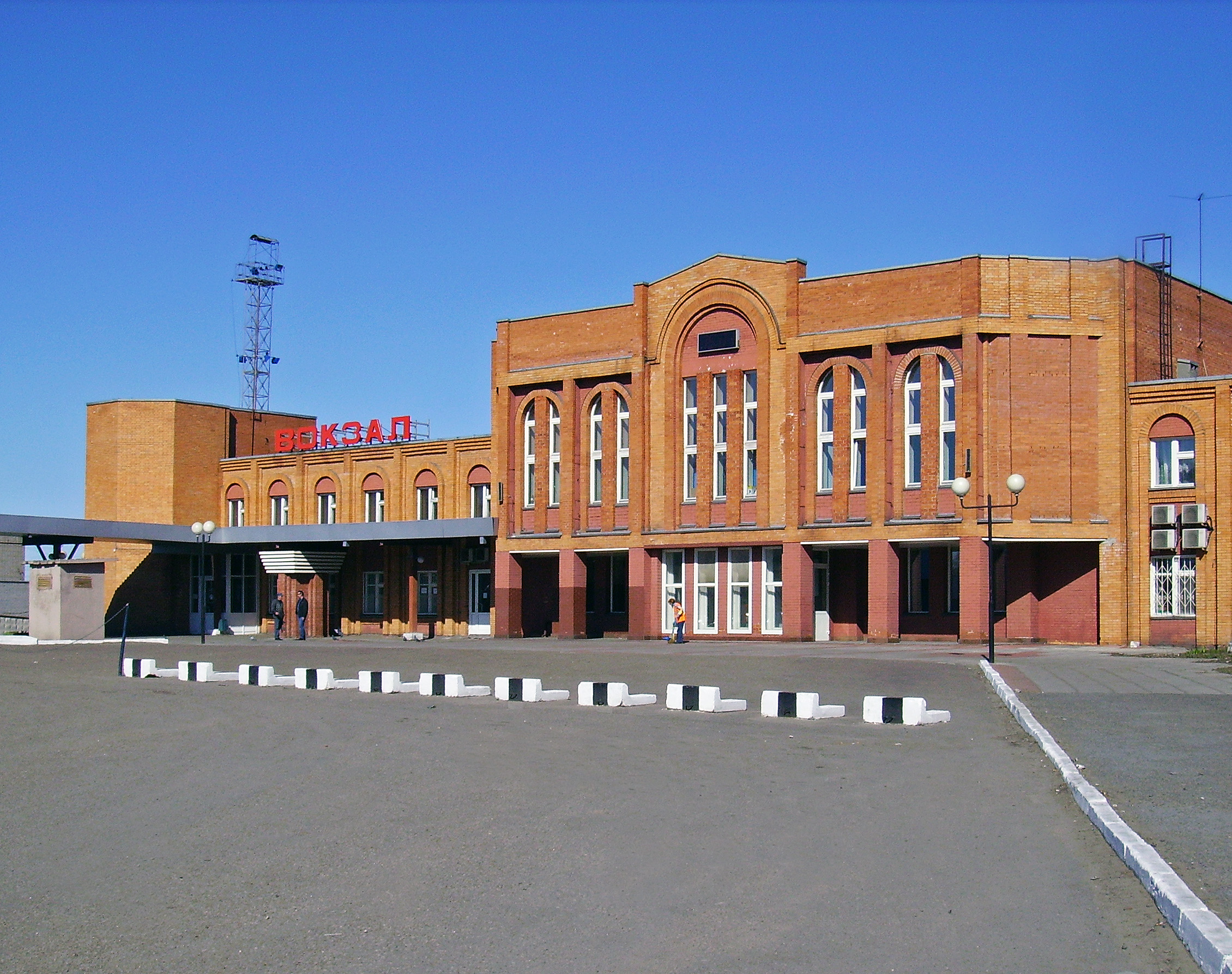
Railroad Station

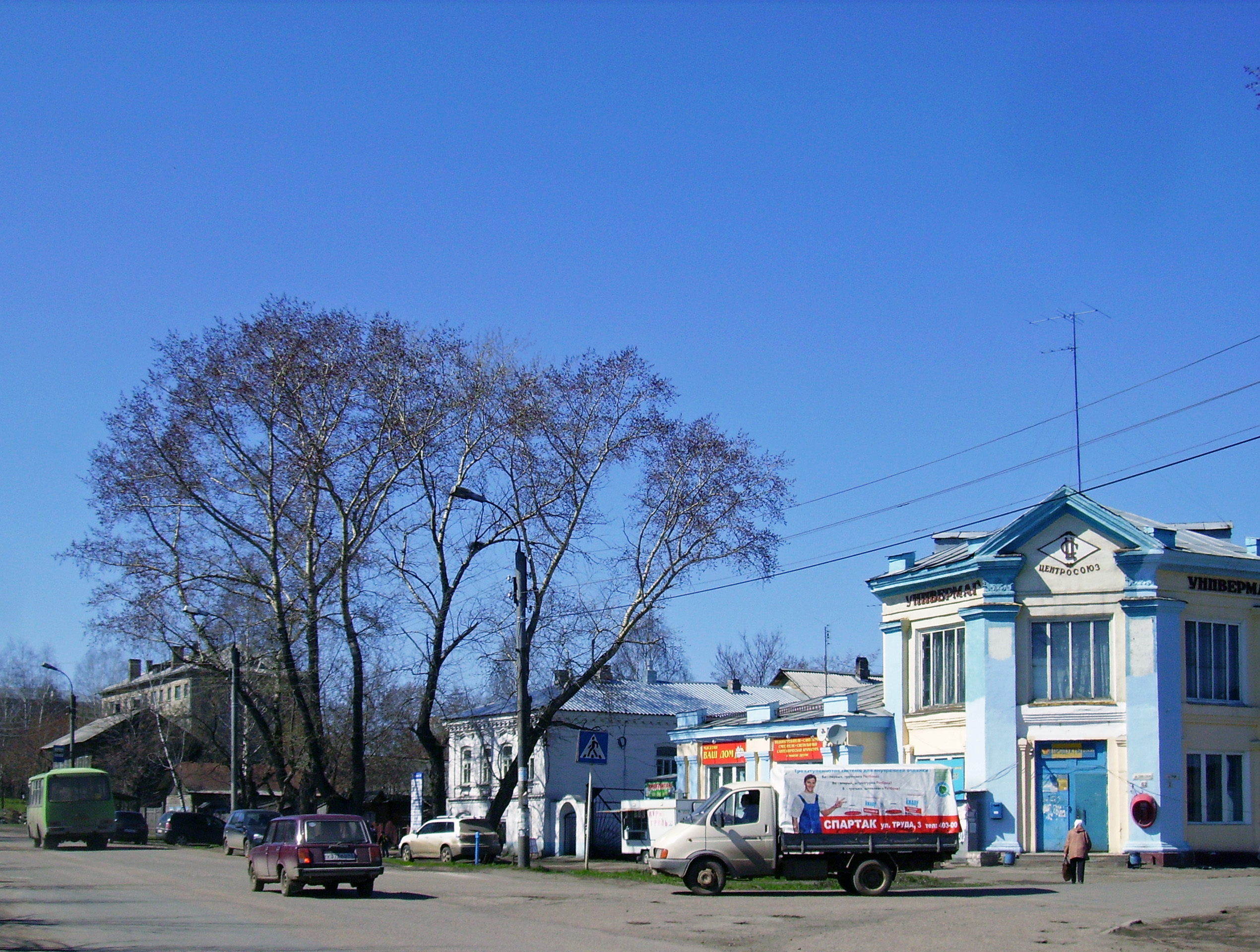
On streets of town

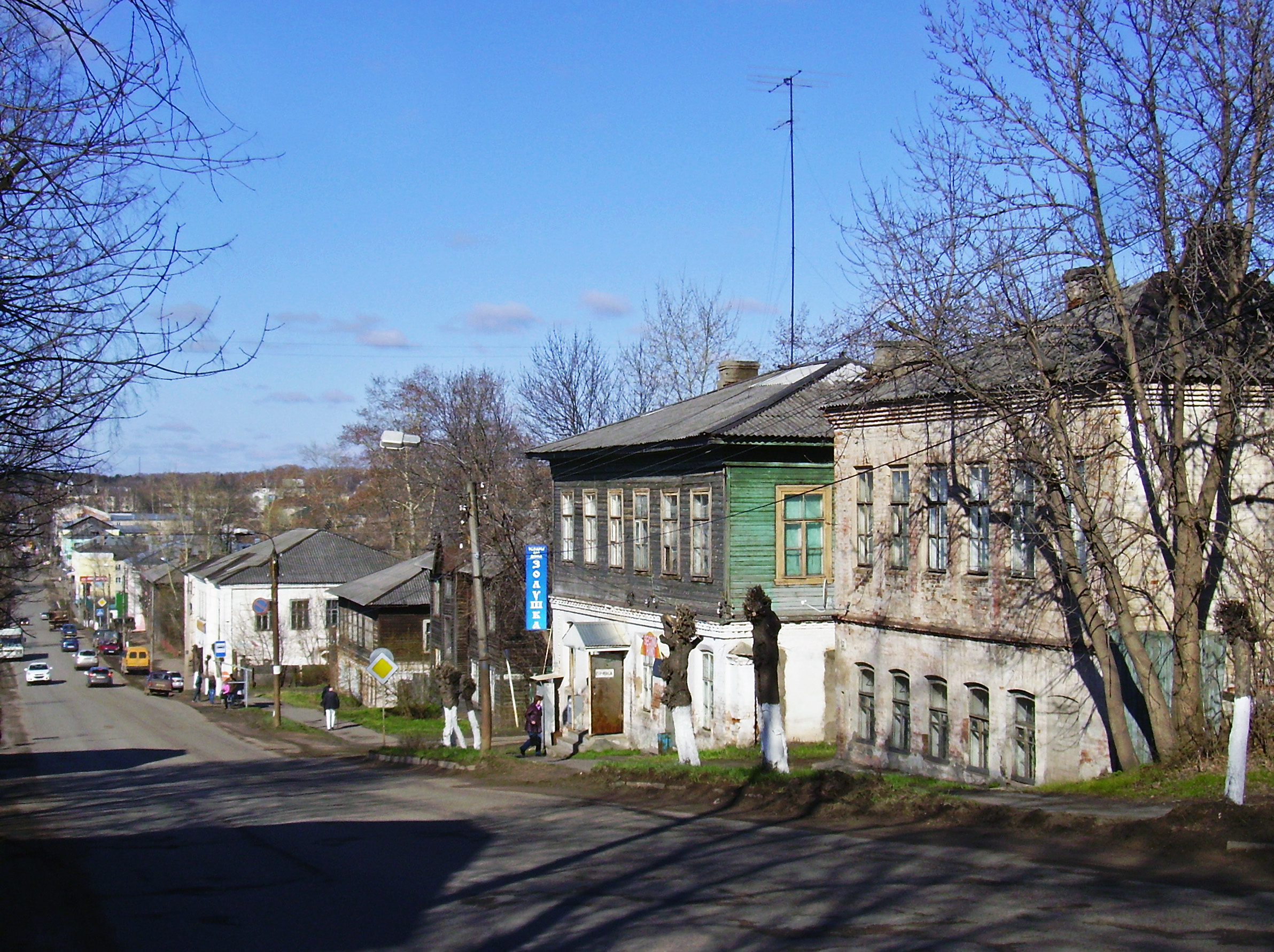
On streets of town

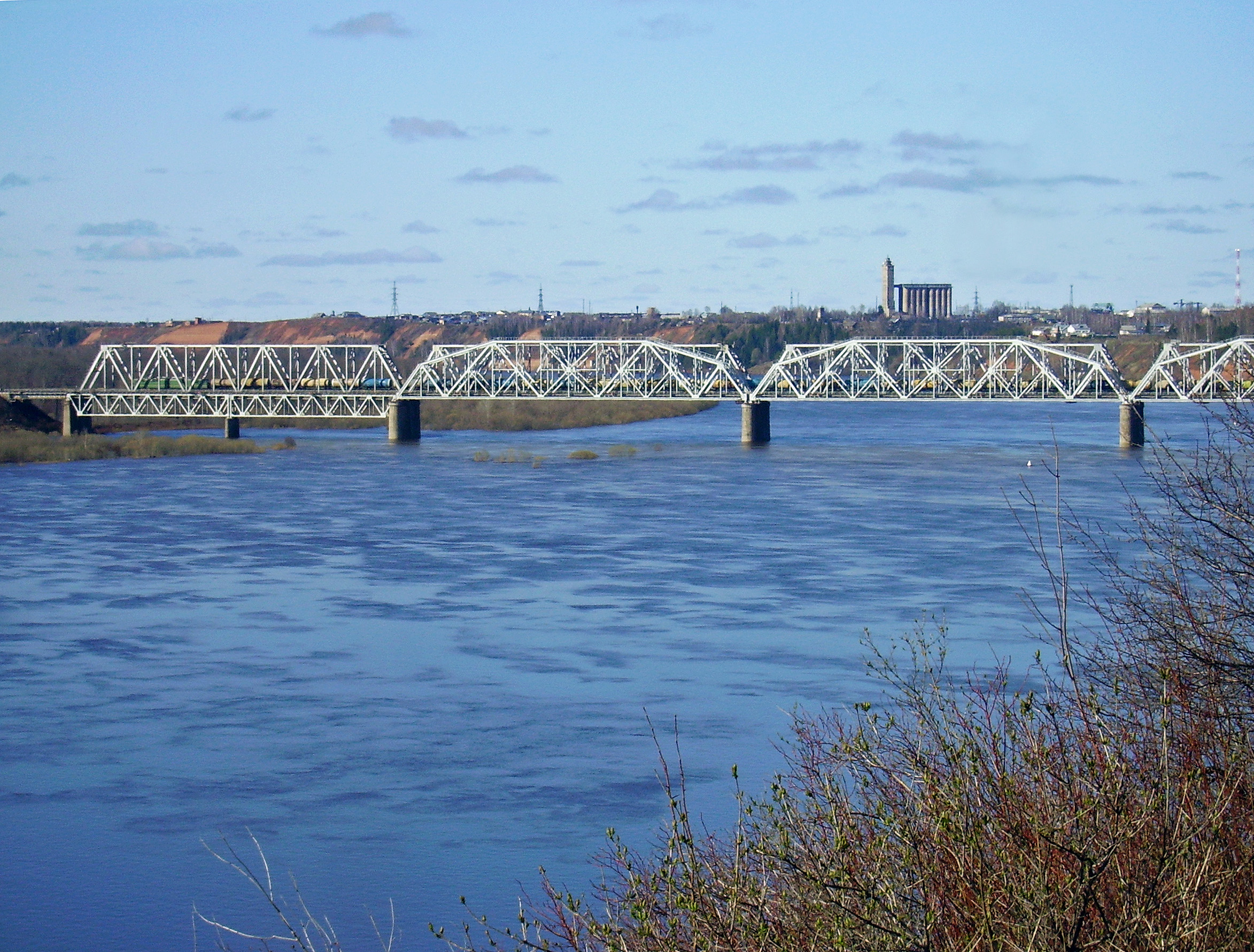
View to Vyatka River

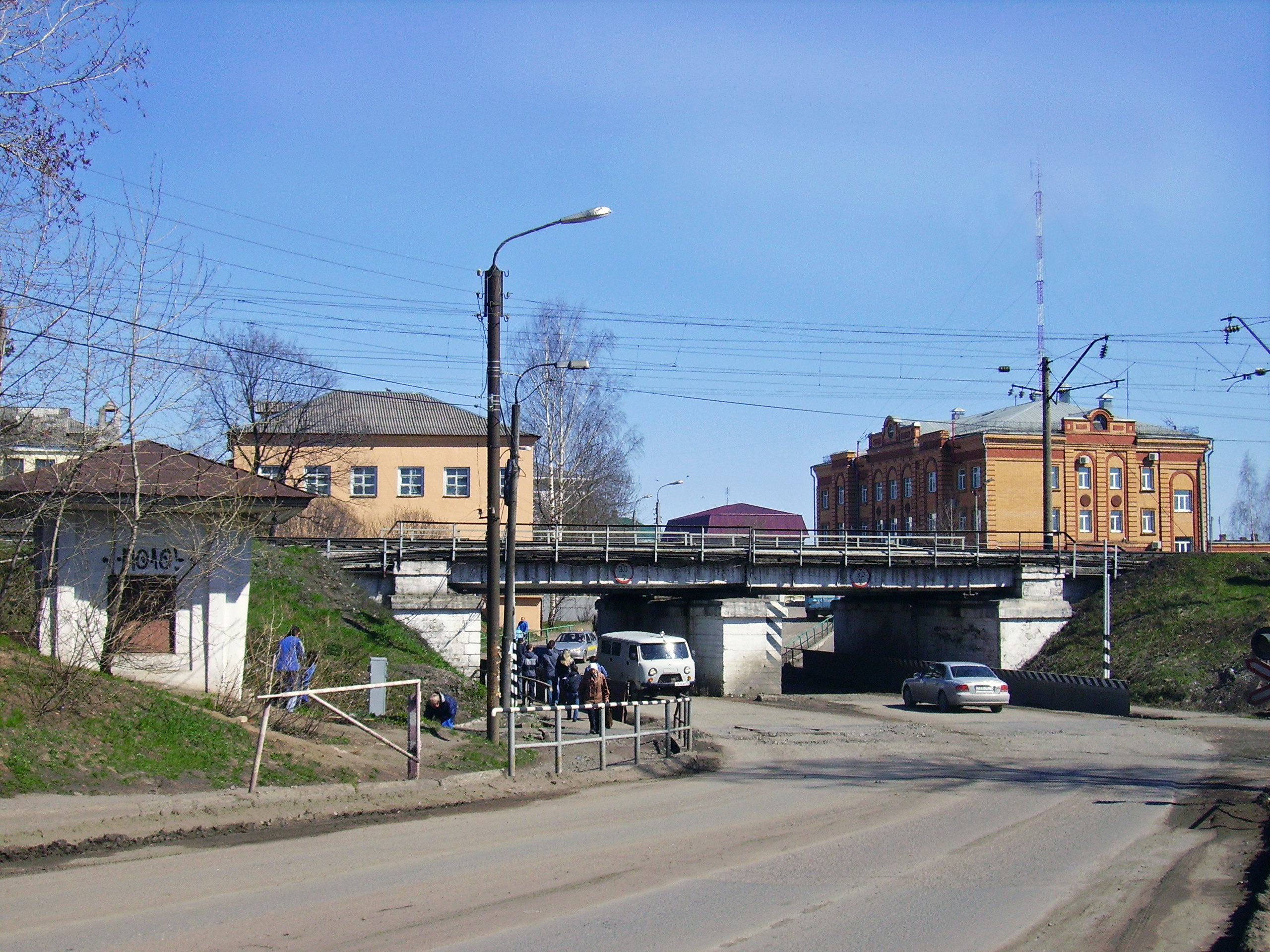
Viaduct
