= Belaya Kholunitsa =

Town in Kirov Oblast, Russia

Belaya Kholunitsa Белая Холуница
- Town
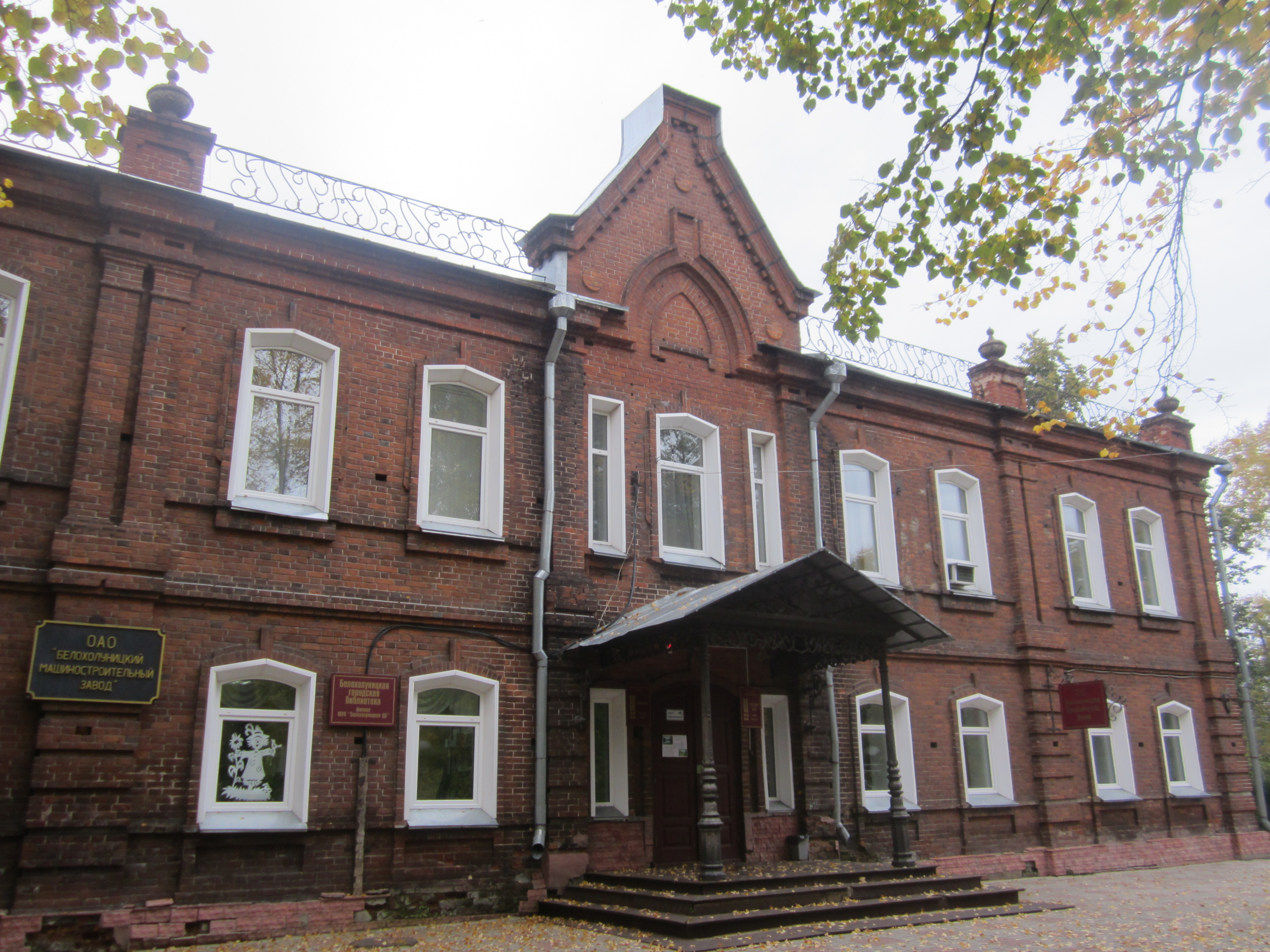
- General Directorate, Belaya Kolunitsa

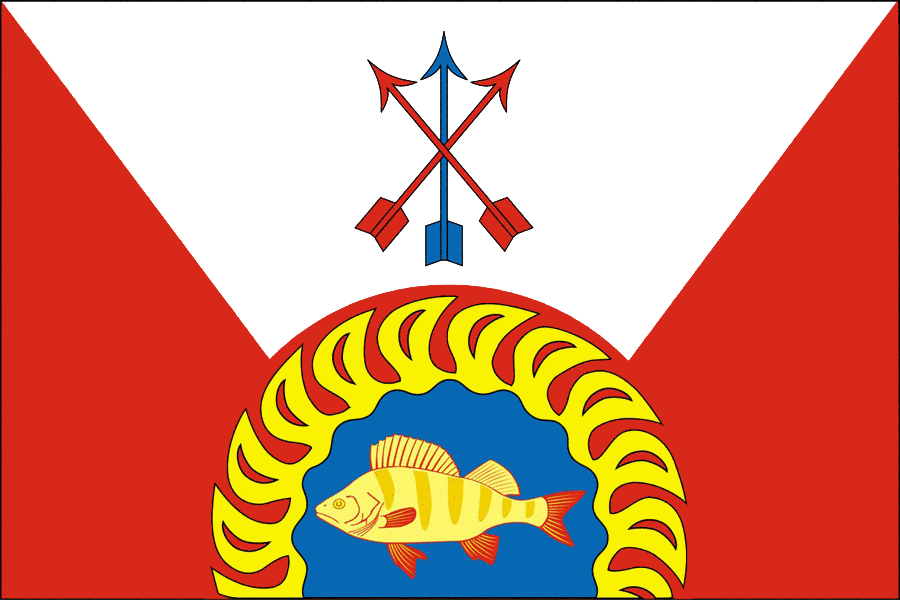
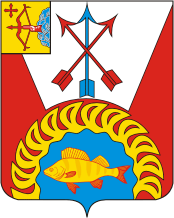
- Flag Coat of arms
- Interactive map of Belaya Kholunitsa
- Location of Belaya Kholunitsa Belaya Kholunitsa (Kirov Oblast)
- Coordinates: 58°51′N 50°52′E
- Country: Russia
- Federal subject: Kirov Oblast
- Administrative district: Belokholunitsky District
- TownSelsoviet: Belaya Kholunitsa
- Founded: 1764
- Town status since: 1965
- Elevation: 140 m (460 ft)

Population (2010 Census)
  - Total: 11,232
  - Estimate (2021): 9,659 (−14%)

Administrative status
  - Capital of: Belokholunitsky District, Town of Belaya Kholunitsa

Municipal status
  - Municipal district: Belokholunitsky Municipal District
  - Urban settlement: Belokholunitskoye Urban Settlement
  - Capital of: Belokholunitsky Municipal District, Belokholunitskoye Urban Settlement
- Time zone: UTC+3 (MSK)
- Postal code: 613200
- OKTMO ID: 33605101001

Belaya Kholunitsa (Russian: Бе́лая Холуни́ца) is a town and the administrative center of Belokholunitsky District in Kirov Oblast, Russia, located on the river Belaya Kholunitsa (Vyatka's tributary), 82 kilometers (51 mi) northeast of Kirov, the administrative center of the oblast. Population: 11,232 (2010 census); 11,975 (2002 census); 13,367 (1989 Soviet census).

It was previously known as Kholunitsky, Belokholunitsky.

== History ==
It was founded in 1764 due to the construction of an ironworks as the settlement of Kholunitsky (Холуницкий). It was later renamed Belokholunitsky (Белохолуницкий) when the river it stood on was renamed. It was granted town status in 1965.

== Administrative and municipal status ==
Within the framework of administrative divisions, Belaya Kholunitsa serves as the administrative center of Belokholunitsky District. As an administrative division, it is, together with nine rural localities, incorporated within Belokholunitsky District as the Town of Belaya Kholunitsa. As a municipal division, the Town of Belaya Kholunitsa is incorporated within Belokholunitsky Municipal District as Belokholunitskoye Urban Settlement.

== Economy ==
Industrial companies in the town include a load-and-carry equipment plant, two logging and two forestry companies, a wood processing and furniture-making plant, a bread-making plant, among others.

There are deposits of iron ore, clay, gravel, lime, rubble, and peat in the town.
