= Urzhum, Altai Krai =

Urzhum Уржум
- Selo
- Location within Altai Krai Location within Russia
- Coordinates: 52°14′N 83°01′E
- Country: Russia
- Region: Altai Krai
- District: Aleysky District
- Time zone: UTC+7:00

Urzhum (Russian: Уржум) is a rural locality (a selo) in Dubrovsky Selsoviet, Aleysky District, Altai Krai, Russia. The population was 237 as of 2013. There are 5 streets.

== Geography ==
Urzhum is located 36 km southeast of Aleysk (the district's administrative centre) by road. Priyatelsky is the nearest rural locality.
