= Urzhum, Urzhumsky District, Kirov Oblast =

Town in Kirov Oblast, Russia

Urzhum Уржум
- Town
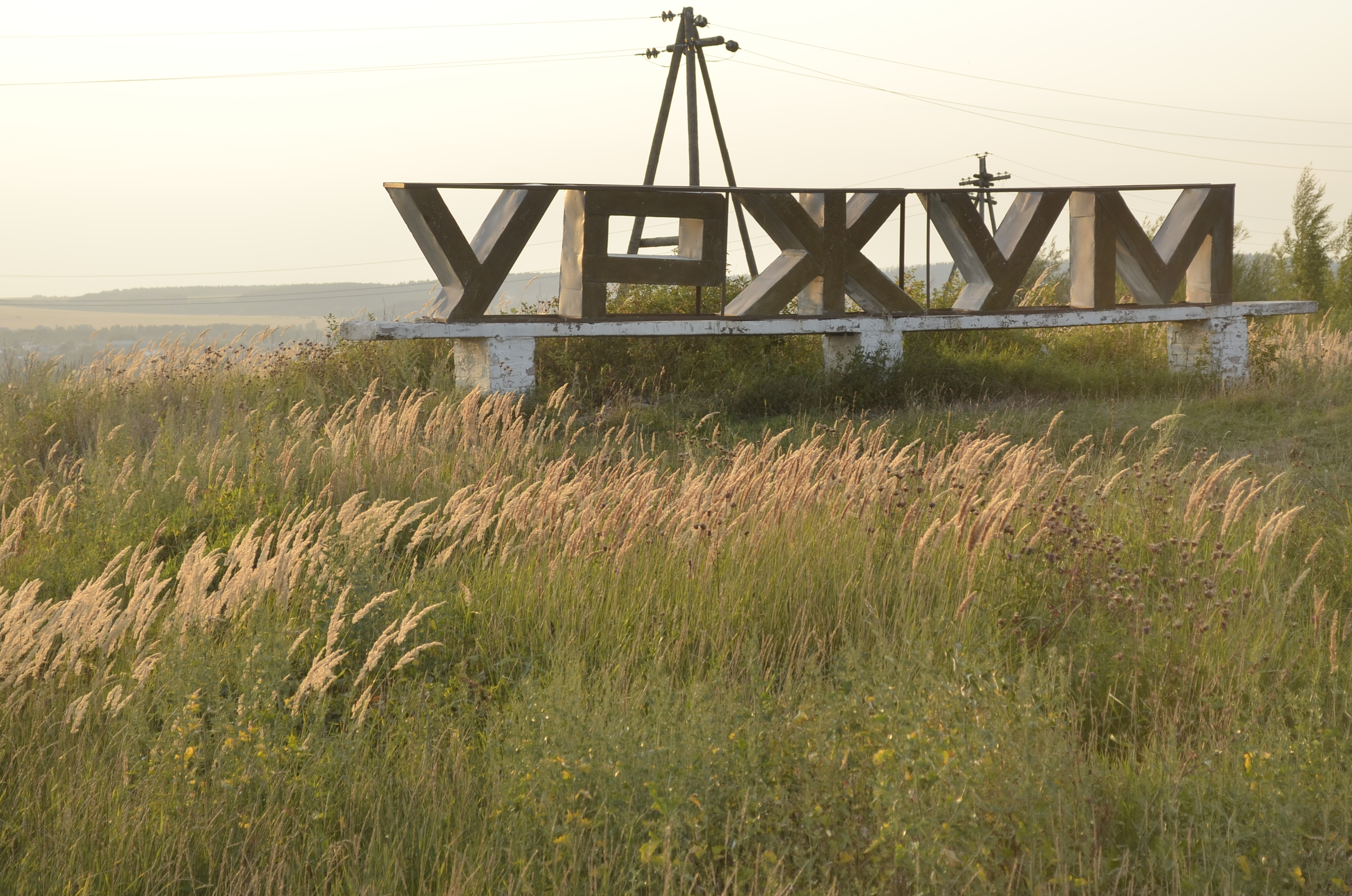
- Welcome sign at the entrance to Urzhum

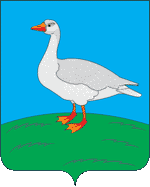
- Coat of arms
- Interactive map of Urzhum
- Location of Urzhum Urzhum (Kirov Oblast)
- Coordinates: 57°07′N 50°00′E
- Country: Russia
- Federal subject: Kirov Oblast
- Administrative district: Urzhumsky District
- TownSelsoviet: Urzhum
- First mentioned: 1554
- Town status since: 1796
- Elevation: 90 m (300 ft)

Population (2010 Census)
  - Total: 10,213
  - Estimate (2025): 8,210 (−19.6%)

Administrative status
  - Capital of: Urzhumsky District, Town of Urzhum

Municipal status
  - Municipal district: Urzhumsky Municipal District
  - Urban settlement: Urzhumskoye Urban Settlement
  - Capital of: Urzhumsky Municipal District, Urzhumskoye Urban Settlement
- Time zone: UTC+3 (MSK)
- Postal codes: 613530, 613531
- OKTMO ID: 33641101001

Urzhum (Russian: Уржу́м; Mari: Вӱрзым, Vürzym or Ӱржӱм, Üržüm) is a town and the administrative center of Urzhumsky District in Kirov Oblast, Russia, located on the left bank of the Urzhumka River about 10 kilometers (6.2 mi) from its confluence with the Vyatka River. Population: 10,213 (2010 census); 11,514 (2002 census); 12,101 (1989 Soviet census).

== History ==
It was first mentioned in 1554 as a Mari town. The town was named after the river, although the name has no reliable etymology. In 1584, Urzhum was refounded as a Russian fortress with the aim of keeping down Mari and Tatar revolts. Town status was granted to it in 1796.

== Administrative and municipal status ==
Within the framework of administrative divisions, Urzhum serves as the administrative center of Urzhumsky District. As an administrative division, it is incorporated within Urzhumsky District as the Town of Urzhum. As a municipal division, the Town of Urzhum is incorporated within Urzhumsky Municipal District as Urzhumskoye Urban Settlement.

== Notable people ==
- Sergey Kirov, statesman
- Nikolay Zabolotsky, poet
