= Belaya Kholunitsa (river) =

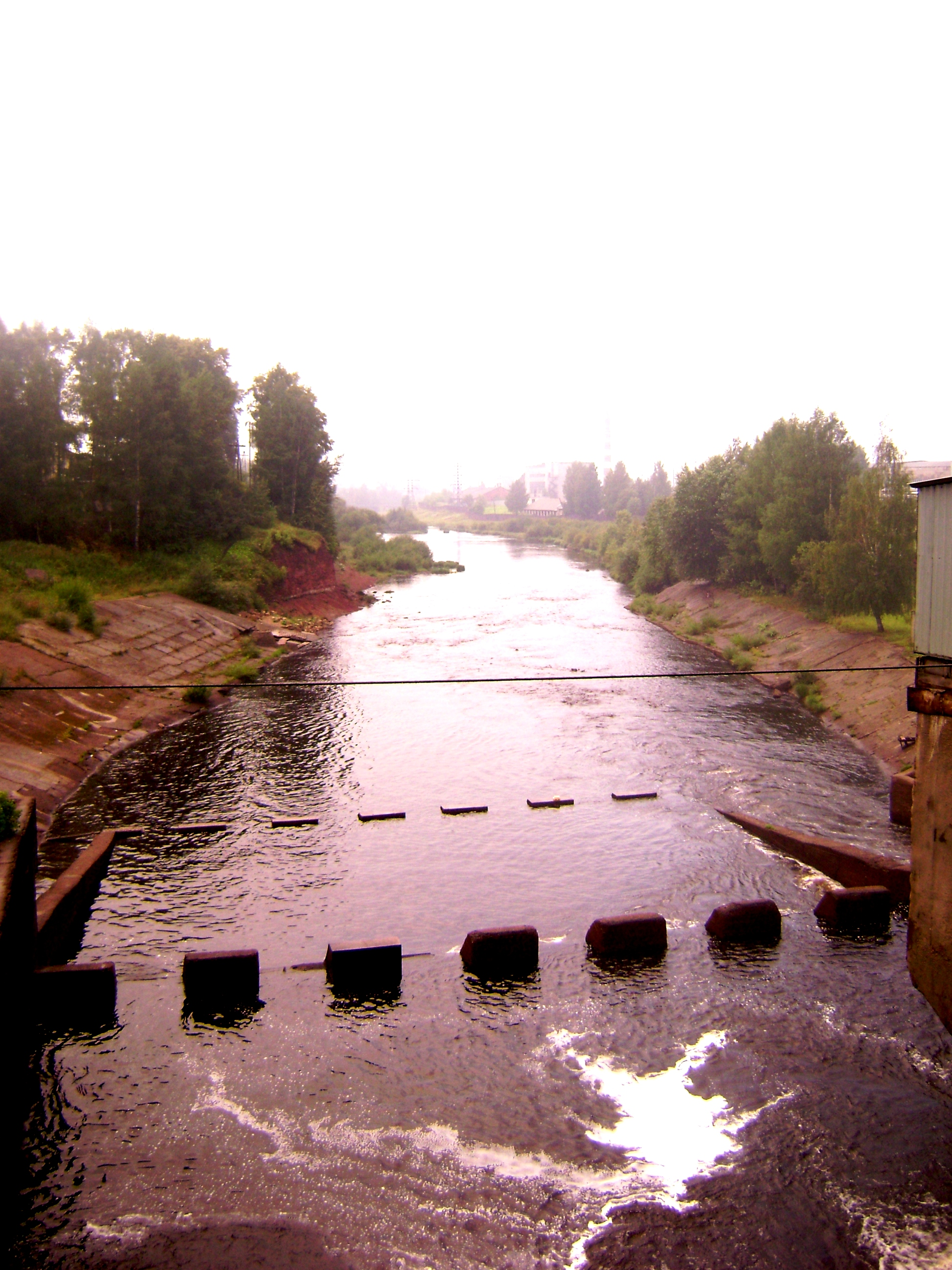
- Native name: Белая Холуница (Russian)

Location
- Country: Russia

Physical characteristics
- Mouth: Vyatka
  - coordinates: 58°41′55″N 50°13′25″E
- Length: 168 km (104 mi)
- Basin size: 2,800 km^{2} (1,100 sq mi)

Basin features
- Progression: Vyatka→ Kama→ Volga→ Caspian Sea

The Belaya Kholunitsa (Russian: Бе́лая Холуни́ца) is a river in Kirov Oblast in Russia, a left tributary of the Vyatka. It is 168 kilometres (104 mi) long, and the area of its drainage basin is 2,800 square kilometres (1,100 mi^{2}).

The Belaya Kholunitsa has its sources in the Upper Kama Upland, and flows through a flat landscape. The river is frozen over from November to April. It is used for floating of timber.

The town of Belaya Kholunitsa is situated by the river.
