= Letka (river) =

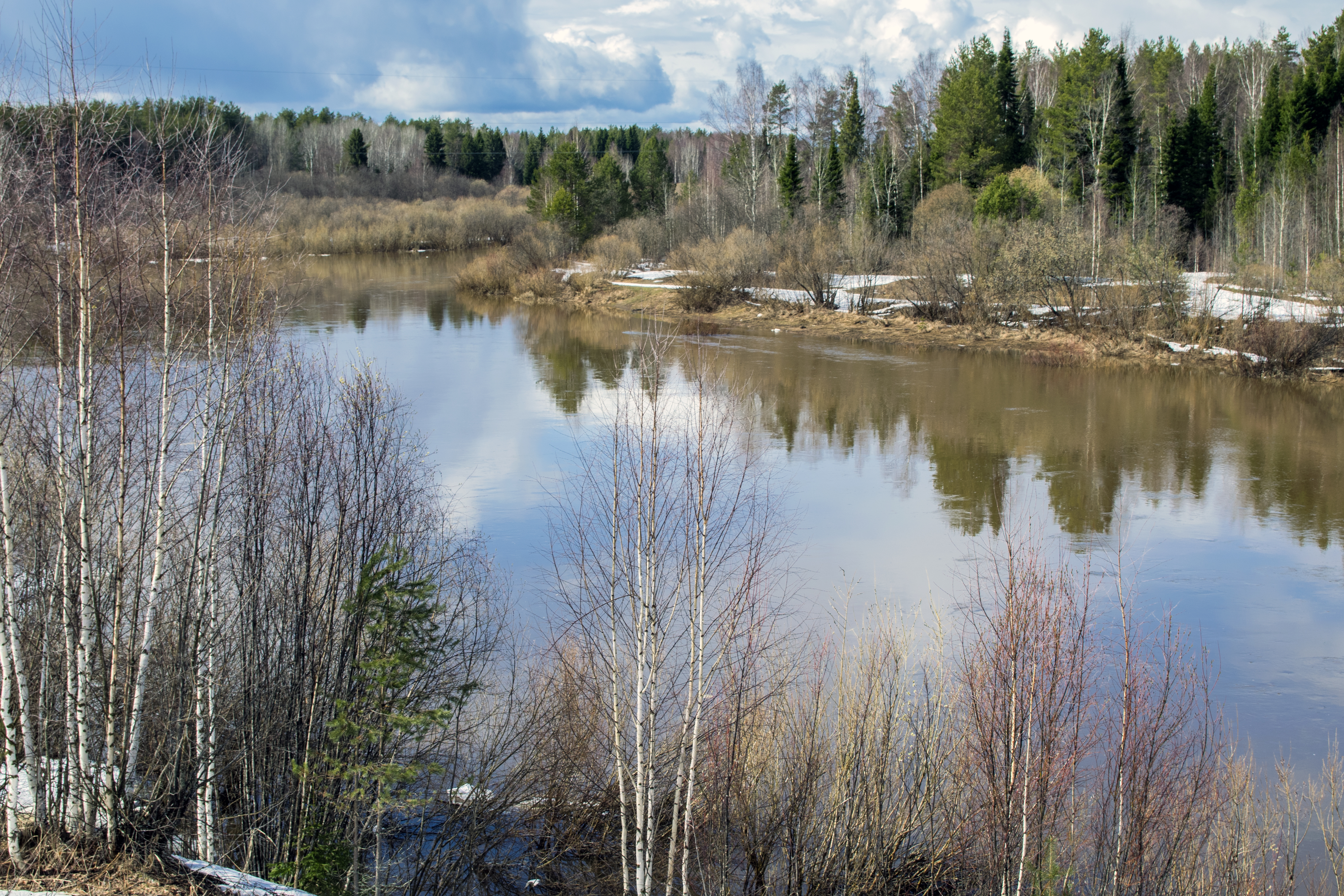
- Native name: Летка (Russian)

Location
- Country: Russia

Physical characteristics
- Mouth: Vyatka
  - coordinates: 58°58′00″N 50°12′25″E
- Length: 260 km (160 mi)
- Basin size: 3,680 km^{2} (1,420 sq mi)

Basin features
- Progression: Vyatka→ Kama→ Volga→ Caspian Sea

The Letka (Russian: Летка) is a river in the Komi Republic and Kirov Oblast in Russia. It is a right tributary of the Vyatka. The river is 260 kilometres (160 mi) long, and its drainage basin covers 3,680 square kilometres (1,420 mi^{2}). The Letka is navigable along its lower reaches.
