= Priyatelsky =

Priyatelsky Приятельский
- Settlement
- Location within Altai Krai Location within Russia
- Coordinates: 52°12′49″N 83°05′11″E
- Country: Russia
- Region: Altai Krai
- District: Aleysky District
- Time zone: UTC+7:00

Priyatelsky (Russian: Приятельский) is a rural locality (a settlement) in Dubrovsky Selsoviet, Aleysky District, Altai Krai, Russia. The population was 219 as of 2013. There are 5 streets.

== Geography ==
Priyatelsky is located 42 km southeast of Aleysk (the district's administrative centre) by road. Tolstaya Dubrova is the nearest rural locality.
