= Oskolkovo =

Oskolkovo Осколково
- Village
- Location within Altai Krai Location within Russia
- Coordinates: 52°19′12″N 83°09′47″E
- Country: Russia
- Region: Altai Krai
- District: Aleysky District
- Time zone: UTC+7:00

Oskolkovo (Russian: Осколково) is a rural locality (a selo) and the administrative center of Oskolkovsky Selsoviet, Aleysky District, Altai Krai, Russia. The population was 728 as of 2016. There are 10 streets.

== Geography ==
Oskolkovo is located 54 km southeast of Aleysk (the district's administrative centre) by road. Tolstaya Dubrova is the nearest rural locality.
