= Belokholunitsky District =

Belokholunitsky District Белохолуницкий район (Russian)
- District
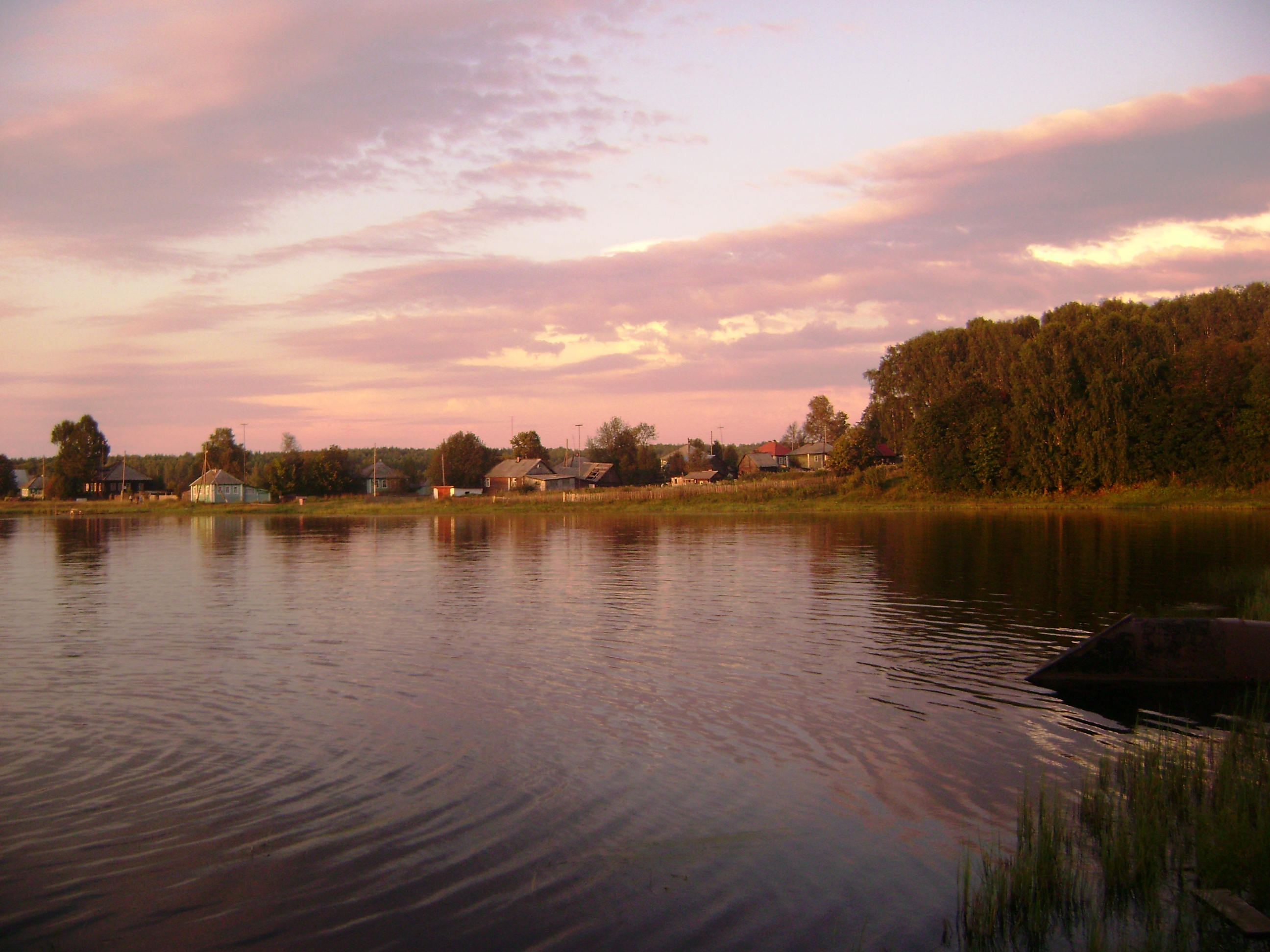
- Klimkovsky Pond, Belokholunitsky District

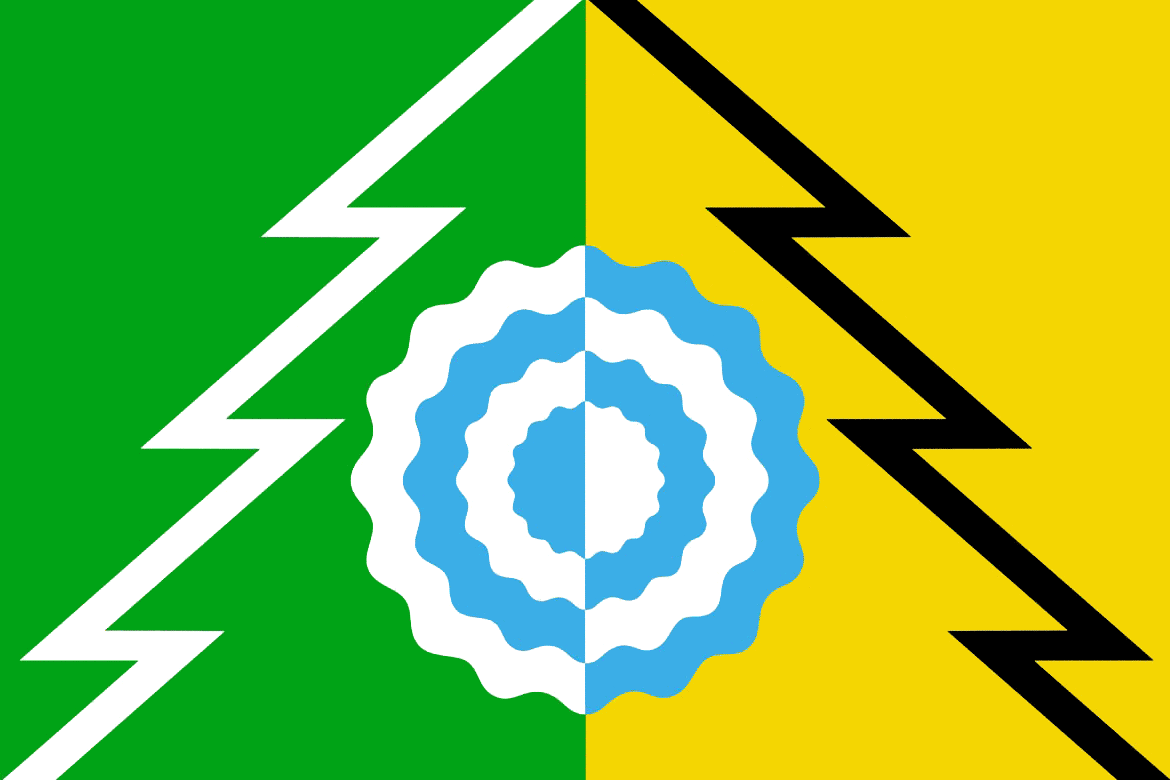
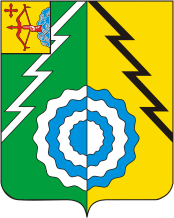
- Flag Coat of arms
- Location of Belokholunitsky District in Kirov Oblast
- Coordinates: 58°50′N 50°51′E
- Country: Russia
- Federal subject: Kirov Oblast
- Established: 29 July 1929
- Administrative center: Belaya Kholunitsa

Area
  - Total: 5,064 km^{2} (1,955 sq mi)

Population (2010 Census)
  - Total: 19,890
  - Density: 3.928/km^{2} (10.17/sq mi)
  - Urban: 56.5%
  - Rural: 43.5%

Administrative structure
  - Administrative divisions: 1 Towns, 10 Rural okrugs
  - Inhabited localities: 1 cities/towns, 39 rural localities

Municipal structure
  - Municipally incorporated as: Belokholunitsky Municipal District
  - Municipal divisions: 1 urban settlements, 10 rural settlements
- Time zone: UTC+3 (MSK)
- OKTMO ID: 33605000
- Website: http://www.bhregion.ru/

Belokholunitsky District (Russian: Белохолуни́цкий райо́н) is an administrative and municipal district (raion), one of the thirty-nine in Kirov Oblast, Russia. It is located in the northeast of the oblast. The area of the district is 5,064 square kilometers (1,955 sq mi). Its administrative center is the town of Belaya Kholunitsa. Population: 19,890 (2010 census); 23,232 (2002 Census); 27,156 (1989 Soviet census). The population of Belaya Kholunitsa accounts for 56.5% of the district's total population.
