= Tolstaya Dubrova =

Tolstaya Dubrova Толстая Дуброва
- Selo
- Location within Altai Krai Location within Russia
- Coordinates: 52°15′45″N 83°09′57″E
- Country: Russia
- Region: Altai Krai
- District: Aleysky District
- Time zone: UTC+7:00

Tolstaya Dubrova (Russian: Толстая Дуброва) is a rural locality (a selo) and the administrative center of Dubrovsky Selsoviet, Aleysky District, Altai Krai, Russia. The population was 448 as of 2013. There are 7 streets.

== Geography ==
Tolstaya Dubrova is located on the Beloborodskoye Lake, 46 km southeast of Aleysk (the district's administrative centre) by road. Oskolkovo is the nearest rural locality.
