= Pizhma (Vyatka) =

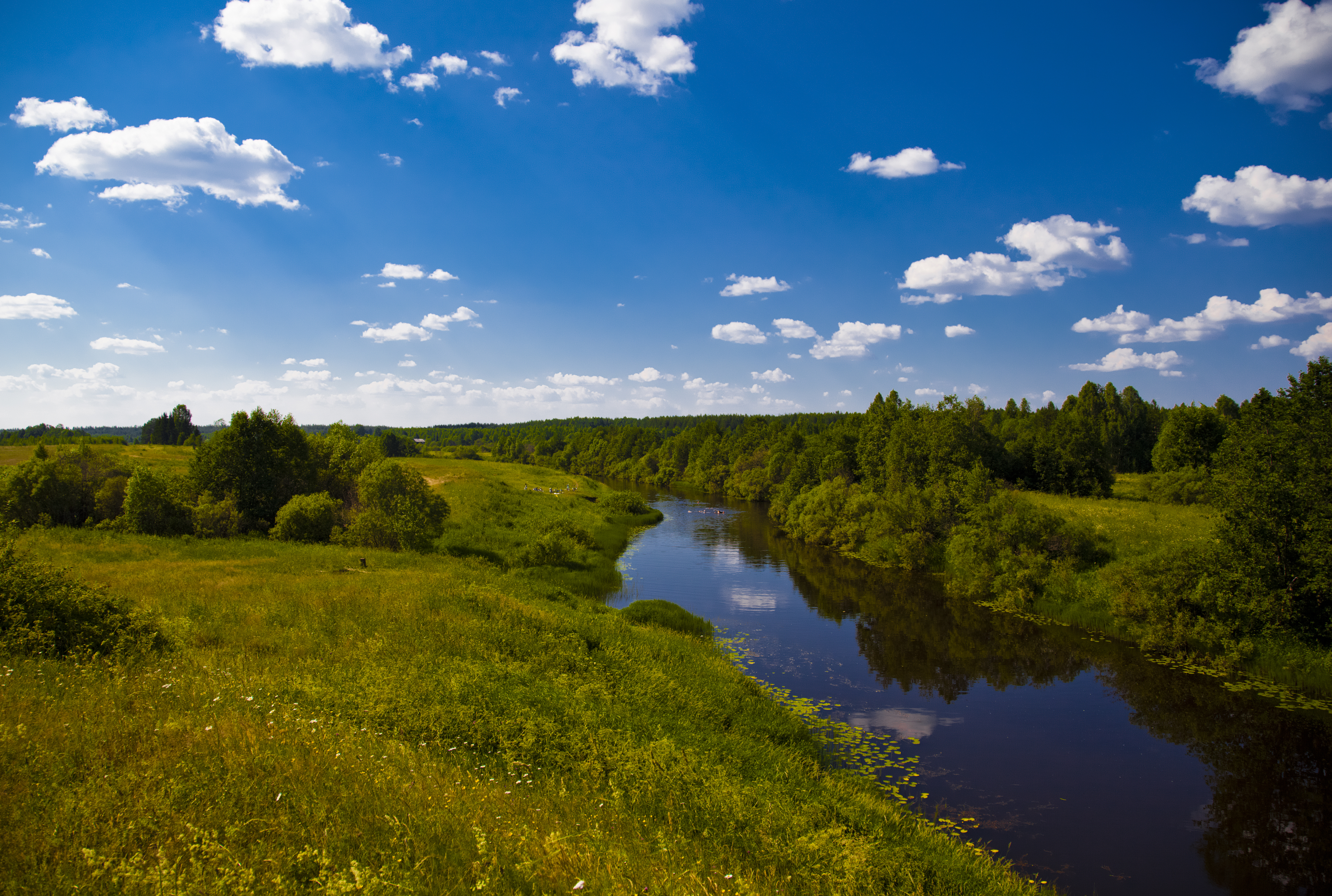
- Native name: Пижма (Russian)

Location
- Country: Russia

Physical characteristics
- Mouth: Vyatka
  - coordinates: 57°36′44″N 48°57′46″E
- Length: 305 km (190 mi)
- Basin size: 15,000 km^{2} (5,800 sq mi)

Basin features
- Progression: Vyatka→ Kama→ Volga→ Caspian Sea

The Pizhma (Russian: Пижма) is a river in Nizhny Novgorod and Kirov Oblasts in Russia, a tributary of the Vyatka. The length of the river is 305 km, the area of its basin is 15,000 km^{2}. The Pizhma freezes up in mid-November and stays icebound until the second half of April. The Pizhma is navigable within 144 km of its estuary. The Nemda is a right tributary of the Pizhma.
