= Moloma =

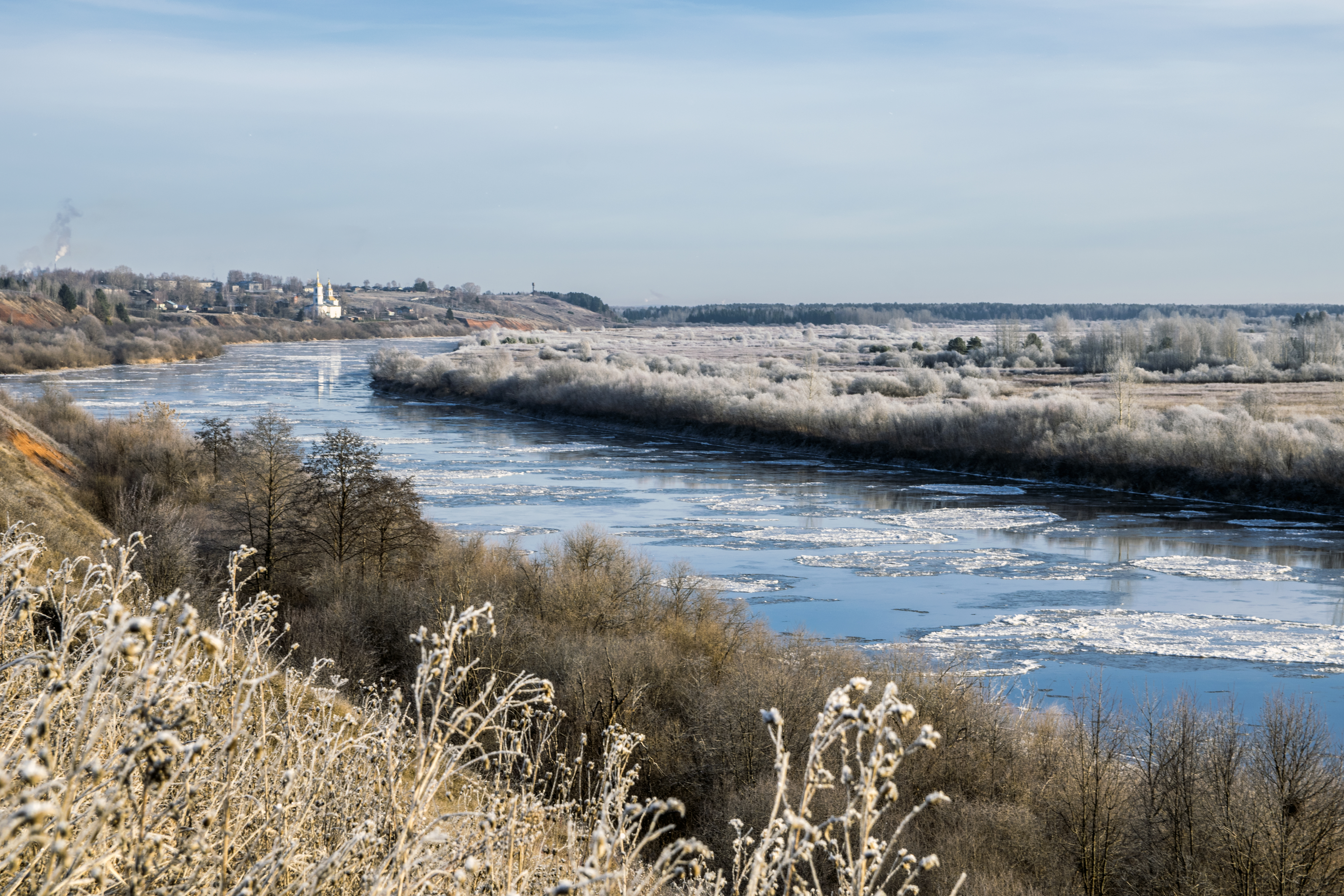
- Native name: Молома (Russian)

Location
- Country: Russia

Physical characteristics
- Mouth: Vyatka
  - coordinates: 58°20′10″N 48°27′41″E
- Length: 419 km (260 mi)
- Basin size: 12,700 km^{2} (4,900 sq mi)

Basin features
- Progression: Vyatka→ Kama→ Volga→ Caspian Sea

The Moloma (Russian: Моло́ма) is a river in Kirov Oblast in Russia, a right tributary of the Vyatka. It is 419 kilometres (260 mi) long, and its drainage basin covers 12,700 square kilometres (4,900 mi^{2}). The Moloma freezes over in early November and stays icebound until April.
