= Kilmez (river) =

Coordinates: 56°57′20″N 50°28′06″E

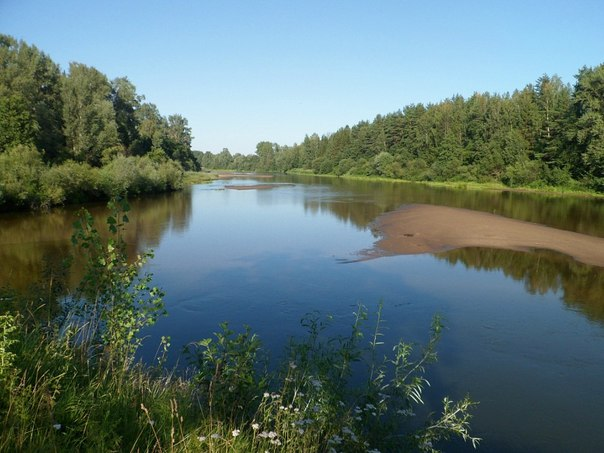
- Native name: Кильмезь (Russian)

Location
- Country: Russia

Physical characteristics
- Mouth: Vyatka
- Length: 270 km (170 mi)
- Basin size: 17,200 km^{2} (6,600 sq mi)

Basin features
- Progression: Vyatka→ Kama→ Volga→ Caspian Sea

The Kilmez (Russian: Кильмезь; Udmurt: Калмез) is a river in Udmurtia and Kirov Oblast in Russia, a left tributary of the Vyatka. The river is 270 kilometres (170 mi) long, and the area of its drainage basin is 17,200 square kilometres (6,600 mi^{2}). The Kilmez freezes over in November and remains icebound until the second half of April. Its main tributaries are the Lumpun, Loban, and Vala.
