= Urzhumsky District =

Urzhumsky District Уржумский район (Russian)
- District
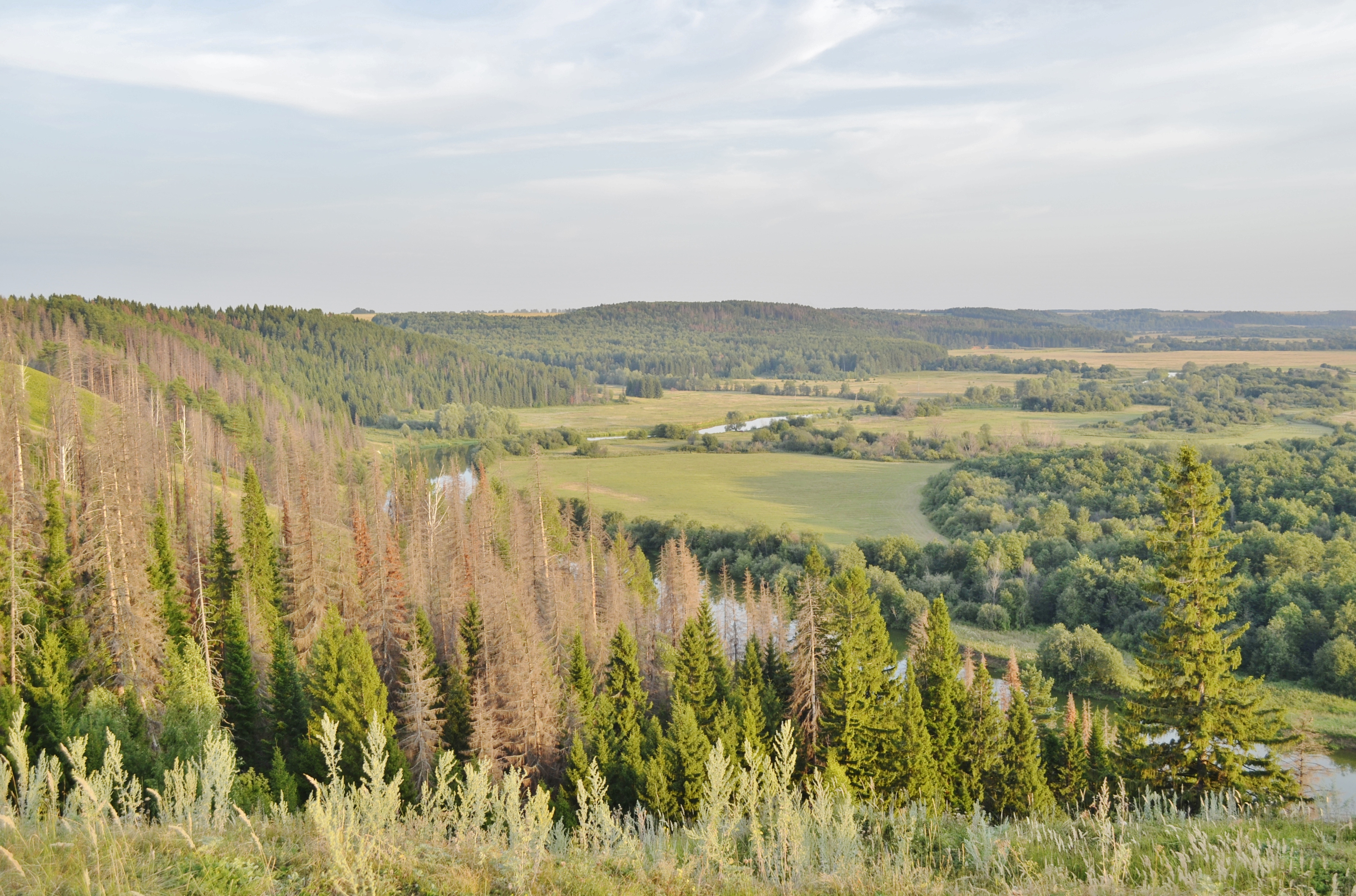
- Landscape in Urzhumsky District

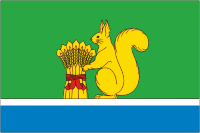
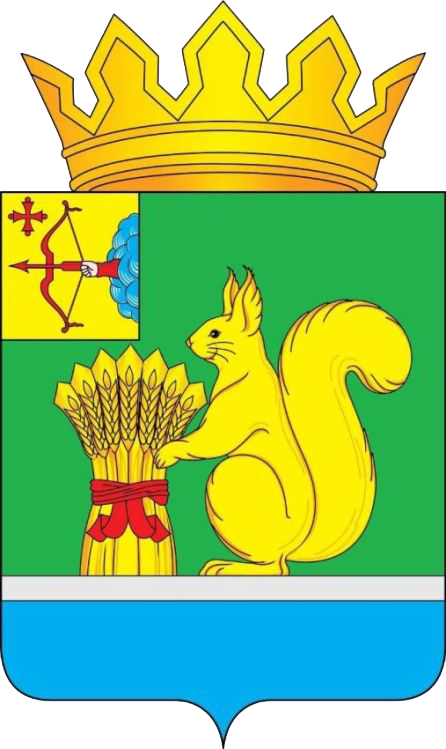
- Flag Coat of arms
- Location of Urzhumsky District in Kirov Oblast
- Coordinates: 57°07′N 50°00′E
- Country: Russia
- Federal subject: Kirov Oblast
- Established: 15 July 1929
- Administrative center: Urzhum

Area
  - Total: 3,025 km^{2} (1,168 sq mi)

Population (2010 Census)
  - Total: 27,075
  - Density: 8.950/km^{2} (23.18/sq mi)
  - Urban: 37.7%
  - Rural: 62.3%

Administrative structure
  - Administrative divisions: 1 Towns, 13 Rural okrugs
  - Inhabited localities: 1 cities/towns, 124 rural localities

Municipal structure
  - Municipally incorporated as: Urzhumsky Municipal District
  - Municipal divisions: 1 urban settlements, 13 rural settlements
- Time zone: UTC+3 (MSK)
- OKTMO ID: 33641000
- Website: http://www.vurzhume.ru/

Urzhumsky District (Russian: Уржумский райо́н) is an administrative and municipal district (raion), one of the thirty-nine in Kirov Oblast, Russia. It is located in the south of the oblast. The area of the district is 3,025 square kilometers (1,168 sq mi). Its administrative center is the town of Urzhum. Population: 27,075 (2010 census); 33,959 (2002 Census); 38,836 (1989 Soviet census). The population of Urzhum accounts for 37.7% of the district's total population.
