= Vyatka (river) =

River in Russia

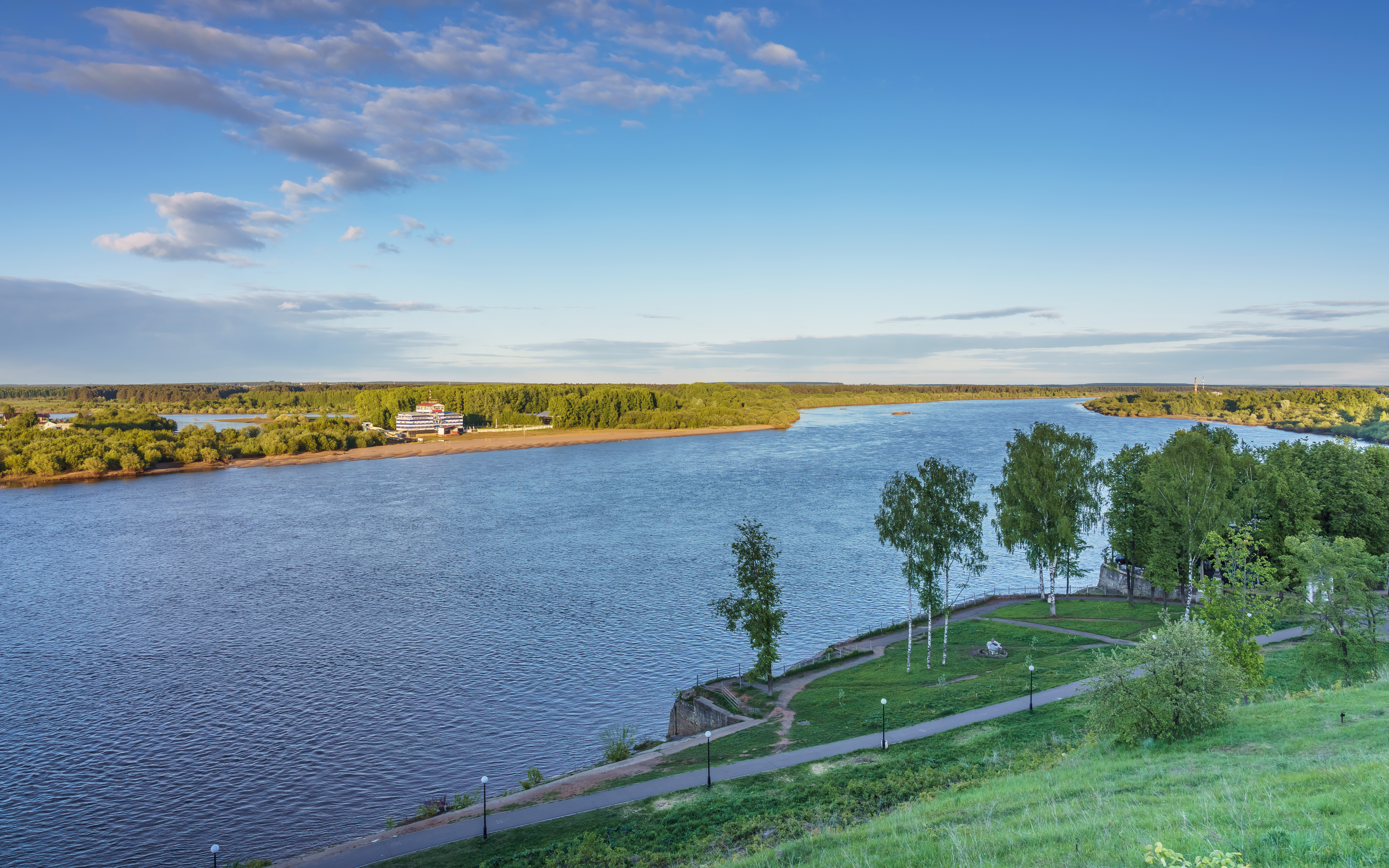
- The Vyatka at Kirov

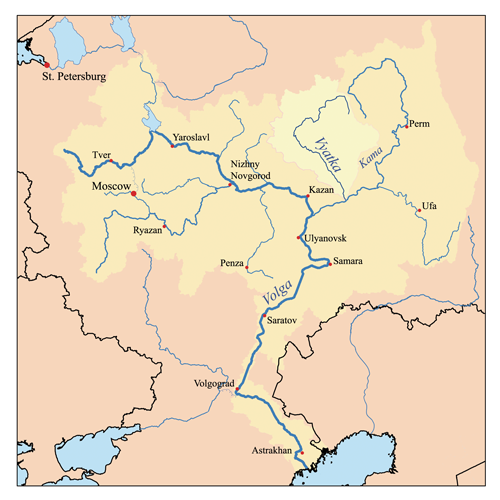
- Map of the Volga watershed with the Vyatka basin highlighted
- Native name: Вятка (Russian)

Location
- Country: Russia

Physical characteristics
- Source
  - location: Yarsky District, Udmurtia
  - coordinates: 58.4520°N 52.1671°E
- Mouth: Kama
  - coordinates: 55.593°N 51.497°E
- Length: 1,314 km (816 mi)
- Basin size: 129,000 km^{2} (50,000 mi^{2})
- Discharge
  - average: 890 cubic metres per second (31,000 cu ft/s)

Basin features
- Progression: Kama→ Volga→ Caspian Sea

The Vyatka (Note: /ˈvjɑːtkə, viˈɑː-/; Russian: Вятка [ˈvʲatkə]; Tatar: Нократ, romanized: Nokrat; Mari: Виче, romanized: Viče; Udmurt: Ватка, romanized: Vatka) is a river in Kirov Oblast and Tatarstan in Russia. It is a right tributary of the Kama. It is 1,314 kilometres (816 mi) long, and its drainage basin covers 129,000 square kilometres (50,000 mi^{2}).

The Vyatka begins in the northern parts of Udmurtia. It freezes over in the early November and remains so until the second half of April. The Vyatka teems with fish, including bream, roach, tench, sheat fish, pike, European perch, zander, etc.

The Vyatka is navigable from its mouth to the city of Kirov, 700 kilometres (430 mi) upriver. Kirov was formerly known as Vyatka after the river before it was renamed in 1934. The main ports are Kirov, Kotelnich, Sovetsk, and Vyatskiye Polyany.

== Tributaries ==
The largest tributaries of the Vyatka are, from source to mouth:

- Belaya (right)
- Kobra (right)
- Letka (right)
- Belaya Kholunitsa (left)
- Cheptsa (left)
- Velikaya (right)
- Bystritsa (left)
- Moloma (right)
- Pizhma (right)
- Voya (left)
- Urzhumka (right)
- Kilmez (left)
- Shoshma (right)
