= Ashalchi Oki =

Russian poet (1898–1973)

Ashalchi Oki (16 April 1898, Kuzebaevo, Yelabuzhsky Uyezd, Vyatka Governorate, Russian Empire - October 31, 1973, Alnashi, Udmurt ASSR) is the literary pseudonym of the first Udmurt woman poet and writer Akilina Grigoryevna Vekshina who received notability in the twenties. She was also known as an ophthalmologist, front-line doctor, and an honored doctor of the Udmurt Autonomous Soviet Socialist Republic.

== Biography ==
Akilina Grigoryevna was born into a peasant family in the village of Kuzebaevo. She was educated at the Karlygan Votsk teacher's school in 1914, she studied with the Kazan workers' faculty in 1921, and with the medical faculty of Kazan University in 1927.

The first poems and stories of Ashalchi Oki appeared in 1918, on the pages of the Udmurt newspaper "Udmurt dunne." In 1928, the first collections of poems including "By the Road" ("Sures Duryn") was published. In 1933, Ashalchi Oki was subjected to political repression: she was accused of having connections with nationalists, after which she abandoned her creative work.

In 1928, she worked as an ophthalmologist in the Yukamensky and Alnashsky districts. She trained in Odessa with Vladimir Filatov.

She was a Member of the Great Patriotic War serving in the Red Army since July 20, 1941. She was a medical captain. For a year and a half she was in charge of the department of toxic gas-gangrenous infection, then she was an intern at the Surgical Field Mobile Hospital No. 571 (the 303rd mobile evacuation point of the 3rd Army of the Belorussian Front). She was awarded medals "For Military Merit" (1944), "For the Capture of Berlin" (1945), and "For Victory over Germany" (1945).

After demobilization from the army in October 1946, she worked as a doctor at the Alnash regional hospital. She was awarded the Order of the Badge of Honor (1958), and she was an Honored Doctor of the Udmurt Autonomous Soviet Socialist Republic.

== Creative work ==
In the work of Ashalchi Oki, the theme of the spiritual wealth of an Udmurt woman occupies a central place. The poet introduced into literature the image of a shy Udmurt girl, reaching out for a new life. She also highlights the problem of humiliation of a woman's dignity. Several poems by Ashalchi Oki became the basis for songs.

Ashalchi Oki's poems were translated into foreign languages in the USSR and abroad.

Ashalchi Oki translated Pushkin (“If life deceives you”) and Heine into the Udmurt language. After 1956, she wrote a number of stories for children.

== Legacy ==
- In 1987, the Ashalchi Oki House-Museum was opened in the village of Alnashi.
- In 1994, the Udmurt National Literary Prize named after Ashalchi Oki was established.
- In 1998, a collection of poems by the author was published in the Udmurt and Russian languages. In the same year, the first issue of a women's magazine was published, and named "Ashalchi" in memory of her.
- In 2002, the Grakhovo Museum of Local Lore was named after the poet.

== See also ==
- Aivo Ivi - Udmurt writer and songwriter, brother of Ashalchi Oki.
