= History of the Jews in Udmurtia and Tatarstan =

Udmurt and Tatar Jews are a special ethnocultural group of Ashkenazi Jews, which originally formed in the areas of the mixed Turkic-speaking (Volga Tatars, Kryashens, Bashkirs, Anatris), Finno-Ugric-speaking (Udmurts, Eastern Maris), and Slavic-speaking (Russians) population. From 1807, Jewish people also began to reside in the industrial and administrative centers of Sarapulsky Uezd (predominantly in Izhevsk, Votkinsk, Sarapul). Until this time the Jews in this region lived only in Kazan (from the 18th century). The occurrence of Jewish communities in the region was made possible only after the decree of Emperor Nicholas I of Russia on August 26, 1827, on the introduction of conscription for the Jews (see Cantonists).

The Ashkenazi Jews first appeared on the territory of the Udmurt Republic in the 1830s. They began to live on the territory of Tatarstan in the same period of time.

== Geographic, ethnocultural and linguistic characteristics ==
Initially the vast majority of Ashkenazi Jews lived in the workmen's settlement of Izhevsky Zavod (at present Izhevsk) and the uezd city of Sarapul (both inhabited localities were at that time a part of the Sarapulsky Uezd of the Vyatka Governorate, are now the two largest cities in Udmurtia), as well as in the city of Kazan (at the time a town and the administrative center of the Kazan Governorate, now the capital of the Republic of Tatarstan). Jews of these territories were Yiddish-speaking.

The local historian and linguist A.V. Altyntsev subdivided the Jews of the region on cultural and linguistic characteristics into two territorial groups: 1) Udmurt Jews (Udmurt Jewry), who lived on the territory of Udmurtia and the north of Tatarstan; 2) Tatar Jews or Kazan Jews (Tatar Jewry or Kazan Jewry), who lived mainly in the city of Kazan and its agglomeration. According to A.V. Altyntsev, the Udmurt Jewry (dos udmurtishe yidntum) had formed the local Idiom (see Идиом, Idiom (Spracheigentümlichkeit)) on the base of the Yiddish of Udmurtia till the 1930s and features of Yiddish of migrants "joined" into it (in the 1930–1940s); as a result up to the 1970–1980s the Udmurt Idiom (Udmurtish) was divided into two linguistic subgroups: the Central subgroup (with centers – Izhevsk, Sarapul and Votkinsk) and the Southern subgroup (with centers – Kambarka, Alnashi, Agryz and Naberezhnye Chelny). One of the characteristic features of the Udmurt Idiom is a noticeable number of Udmurt and Tatar loan words.

Examples
| English | Udmurtisch | Udmurt | Tatar | Russian |
|---|---|---|---|---|
| herd, flock, troop, drove, brood | ule, (š)uley | ullö | - | стая, стадо, табун, выводок |
| Russian (a person is appurtenant to the ethnic group) | d'z'uče(r), džuče(r) | d'z'uč | - | русский |
| big river | kam | kam | - | большая река |
| river | šurχ | šur | - | река |
| boiled rice, congee | botke | - | botka | каша |
| failure, misfortune, reverse, bad luck, ill-luck | kiser, kis'er | kis'ör | - | невзгода, несчастье, неудача, беда, напасть, горесть, горечь |
| priestly, sacerdotal (the word was used only in relation to Udmurt pagan priests) | vös'ašndorf | vös'as (+Yiddish dorf) | - | - |

The word וואָסיאַשנדאָרף vös'ašndorf [vəˈsʲaʃ(ə)ndɔʁf] is a Jewish appellation of the Udmurt village of Kuzebaevo in the Alnashsky District of Udmurtia where southern Udmurts (inhabitants of the village) are performed pagan oblations up to the present day. In connection with the Kazan "centralization" the Tatar Jewry on the main ethnocultural characteristics (language, food, holidays, religion, clothing, etc.) has been more or less holistic. Also the Jewish community of Udmurtia and Tatarstan have had for the greater part cultural-ethnic rather than religious basis because among its members were representatives of different religious characteristics – a confessional affiliation (Judaism, Atheism, Lutheranism, Catholicism, Orthodox Christianity, Baptists, Adventism, Pentecostalism), a degree of religiosity and syncretic elements on the familial-ethnic level (for example some Jewish families celebrate Hanukkah and Christmas). Currently, due to the assimilation processes the Jews of Udmurtia and Tatarstan were successfully integrated into the Russian-speaking space and is actively used the Russian language.

=== Rural Jewish community of Alnashsky District ===
In the Alnashsky District of Udmurtia, there was a fairly large rural Jewish community whose members spoke the Alnashic subdialect of Udmurtish. Many Jews also spoke Udmurt and/or Tatar languages. The Ashkenazi Jews in the Alnashsky District first appeared early in the 20th century (in the 1910s and 1920s). In the 1940s through the 1960s, the number of Jews in the district never exceeded 25–35 people. The primary residences of the Jews there were three settlements: the village of Alnashi, the village of Varzi-Yatchi and the hamlet of Garga. The Alnashic Jewry celebrated all Jewish holydays except for Tu Bishvat. The most revered feasts were Passover (Pesach), Simchat Torah (Simches To(y)reh), Yom Kippur (Yom Kipper), Hanukkah and Purim. The Udmurts of the district often mistook the Jews for Russians but sometimes for russianized Germans or Udmurts. In the 1980s, the Jews mostly left Alnashsky District. In 2015, however, a few Jews lived still in the district as members of interethnic (Jewish-Udmurt) families.

Besides, the Alnashsky District occasionally attended the Subbotniks (Hebrew/Yiddish gerim; Russian subbotniki literally "sabbatarians", novyye zhidy (новые жиды) literally "new Yids", zhidovstvuyushchiye (жидовствующие) literally "Judaizers", iudeystvuyushchiye literally "Judaizers", zhidovery literally "Jewbelievers"; Russian endoethnonym gery to Hebrew ger). The Subbotniks came for a recreation (Varzi-Yatchi sanatorium) or on working affairs. Note that the Russian word zhid (жид) is an antiquated word for 'Jew', and is now considered a racial slur, translating to the English word 'Yid' or 'kike'.

The Alnashsky District's population has a complex ethnic structure. The district is one of 16 rural district of the Udmurt Republic where the Udmurts make up the majority, as well as one of the four districts of compact residence of Mari people. Besides, the Alnashsky District along with the Grakhovsky District and the Kiznersky District is the residence territory of the Kryashens in the rural area of Udmurtia. As a result of the 2002 census, among the 4th largest ethnic group of the district population the Udmurts turned out 81.7%, Russians - 12.2%, Tatars - 3.4%, Mari - 2.1%.

== Synagogues and Jewish ethnocultural formations ==
Under the moral pressure of leadership, Orthodox clergy and higher ranks of the Russian Empire, the Jews of the region to improve their living conditions turned into the Christian faith (mainly Orthodox Christianity). Such cases are known since 1831.

Despite this fact in Izhevsk there were officially registered 56 orthodox Jews in 1846, 55 in 1847 and 130 in 1849. In 1897, there were 221 orthodox Jews in the city of Sarapul, and beyond, on the territory of the Sarapulsky Uezd (mostly in Izhevsk) there were 322 orthodox Jews. In 1861, in the city of Kazan there were 184 Jews, mostly craftsmen and retired soldiers and their families. In 1897, the number of Jews in Kazan had risen to 1467 people (about 1% of the city population).

In Izhevsk, since 1849 under the Jewish religious needs the prayer house was allocated (the Dornbush's house). A second synagogue was opened in 1917 on Verkhniy Uzskiy side street (at present Internatsionalnyiy side street) between Tserkovnaya Street (at present Vadim Sivkov Street) and Gospitalnaya Street (at present Krasnoarmeyskaya Street), it was moved to another location (22 Verkhniy Uzskiy side street) in 1927. Both synagogues were closed in 1930 (by the Soviet authorities).

At the beginning of the 20th century there was a synagogue in the city of Sarapul. The location of the first synagogue is unknown, but from 1915 to 1926 the Sarapul synagogue was located in the wing of a building at 38 Karl Marx Street.

From 1993 through the present time in Udmurtia there is the Association of Jewish culture of the Udmurt Republic (Russian: Общество еврейской культуры Удмуртской Республики). Created to study the history, culture and traditions of the Jewish people. There is a Sunday school. It has a connection with the Jewish Agency and the JDC. In 2000, it had about 400 members.

In the city of Kazan until the late 19th century, the Jewish community was not officially registered. Only on March 18, 1897, were the Jews allowed to make a house of worship, and the Kazan Jewish community was registered. But because of various delays created by the authorities, the Jewish prayer house was not opened until March 12, 1915, and before that, the community rented a private house for religious services. In 1929, the Kazan synagogue was closed by decision of the Presidium of the Central Executive Committee of the Council of Workers, Peasants and Red Army Deputies. Once again, the Jewish religious community was registered in 1990. And after the return of the building of the former prayer house, the Kazan synagogue was opened anew in 1996. It is located on 15 Profsoyuznaya Street in the city of Kazan.

In 1989, the club of Jewish culture "Menorah" was established in the Tatar branch of the Russian Cultural Foundation, which since 1993 is called the Kazan cultural center "Menorah". Since 1991, in Kazan there is the branch of the Jewish Agency. Also, it operated various institutions of education: since 1995 - the Sunday school, since 1998 - the secondary Jewish School №12; since 2000 - the center of World ORT and the Jewish kindergarten. In June 1997, it was officially registered the Jewish communal-charitable center "Hesed Moshe", where in the late of the 1990s received assistance about two thousand people. Since 1994, it is operated "Maccabi World Union" and the club "Golden Age" (Russian: Золотой возраст). "Hesed Moshe" publishes the newspaper "Jewish Street" (Russian: Еврейская улица).

== Population ==
Jews in the Udmurt Republic
| Year | Population |
|---|---|
| 1926* | 254 |
| 1939 | 1,158 |
| 1959 | 2,187 |
| 1979 | 1,815 |
| 1989† | 1,664 |
| 2002 | 935 |
| 2010 | 717 |

*excluding Sarapul

†including Mountain Jews, Georgian Jews, and Central Asian Jews

Jews in Tatarstan
| Year | Population |
|---|---|
| 1926 | 4,265 |
| 1939 | 6,050 |
| 1959 | 10,360 |
| 1979 | 8,650 |
| 1989 | 7,294 |
| 2002 | 3,472 |
| 2010 | 2,624 |

== See also ==
- History of the Jews in Russia
