= Abyshevo, Udmurtia =

Abyshevo Абышево Абышгурт
- Village
- Location within Udmurt Republic Location within Russia
- Coordinates: 56°12′N 52°33′E
- Country: Russia
- Region: Udmurtia
- District: Alnashsky District
- Time zone: UTC+4:00

Abyshevo (Russian: Абышево; Udmurt: Абышгурт, Abyšgurt) is a rural locality (a village) in Romashkinskoye Rural Settlement of Alnashsky District, Udmurtia, Russia. The population was 28 as of 2008. There are 2 streets.

== Geography ==
Abyshevo is located 8 km northeast of Alnashi (the district's administrative centre) by road. Shaytanovo is the nearest rural locality.
