= Yiddish dialects =

Varieties of the Yiddish language

Yiddish dialects are varieties of the Yiddish language and are divided according to the region in Europe where each developed its distinctiveness. Linguistically, Yiddish is divided in distinct Eastern and Western dialects. While the Western dialects mostly died out in the 19th century due to Jewish language assimilation into mainstream culture, the Eastern dialects were very vital until most of Eastern European Jewry was destroyed in the Holocaust, called the Khurbn in Yiddish.

The Northeastern dialects of Eastern Yiddish were dominant in 20th-century Yiddish culture and academia. By the 21st century, the Southern dialects of Yiddish that are preserved in many conservative Hasidic communities have remained to become the most commonly spoken form of Yiddish.

== Varieties ==
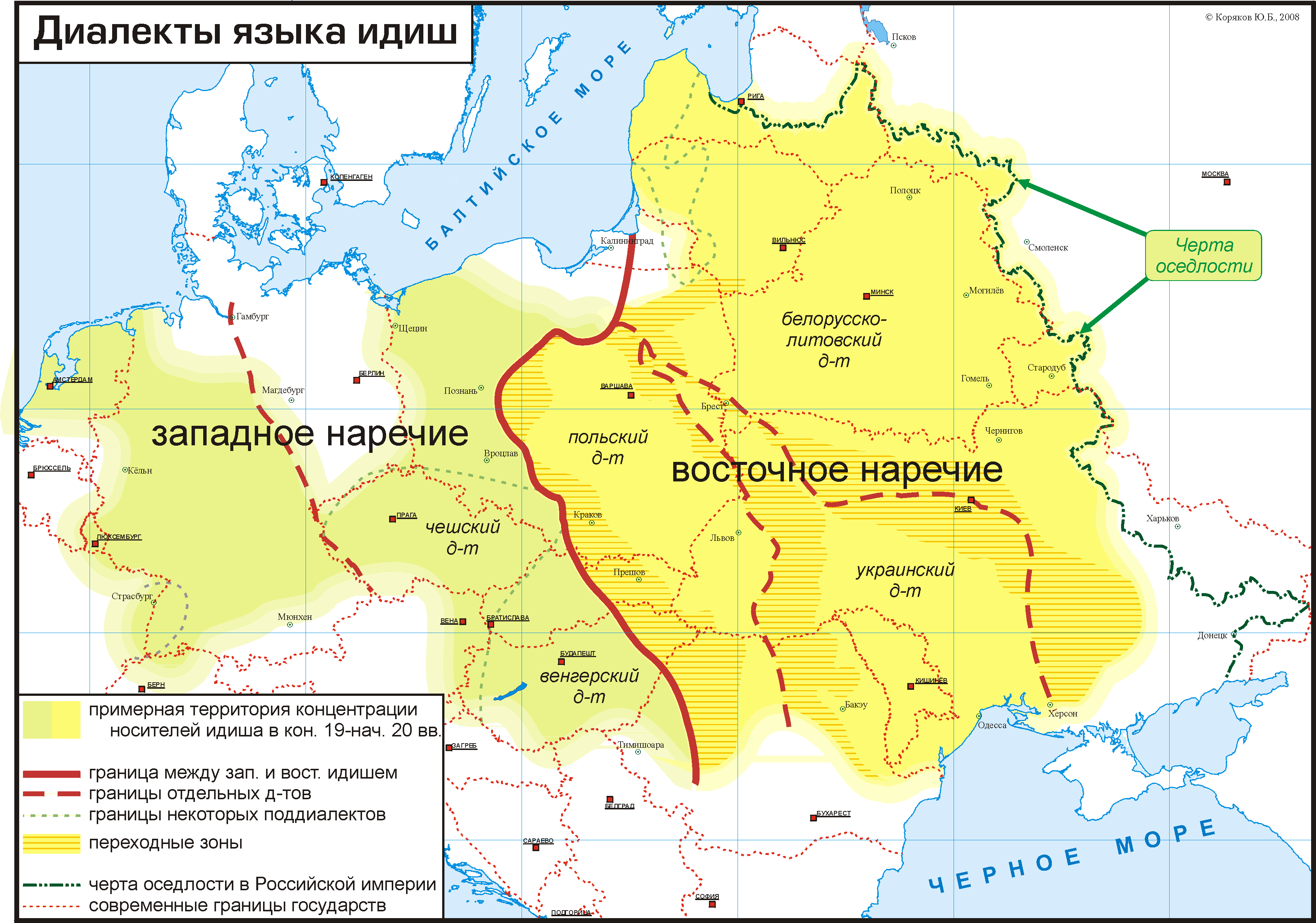
Yiddish dialects (late 19th-early 20th century): Western dialects Eastern dialects

Yiddish dialects are generally grouped into either Western Yiddish and Eastern Yiddish. Western Yiddish developed from the 9th century in Western-Central Europe, in the region that was called Ashkenaz by Jews. Eastern Yiddish developed its distinctive features in Eastern Europe after the movement of large numbers of Jews from western to central and eastern Europe.

General references to the "Yiddish language" without qualification are normally taken to apply to Eastern Yiddish, unless the subject under consideration is Yiddish literature prior to the 19th century. In that case the focus is more likely to be on Western Yiddish.

=== Western Yiddish ===
While most Jews in the Rhineland who escaped persecution in the 14th century fled to the Polish–Lithuanian Commonwealth, some continued to survive in the countryside of Switzerland, southern Germany and Alsace. They maintained Jewish customs and spoke Western Yiddish.

Western Yiddish included three dialects:

- Northwestern (spoken in Northern Germany and the Netherlands),
- Midwestern (spoken in central Germany and Luxembourg),
- Southwestern (spoken in northern Switzerland, southern Germany and Alsace, extending into Northern Italy).

These have a number of clearly distinguished regional varieties, such as Judeo-Alsatian, plus many local subvarieties.

The Judeo-Alsatian traditionally spoken by the Jews of Alsace is called Yédisch-Daïtsch, originally a mixture of German, Hebrew and Aramaic idioms and virtually indistinguishable from mainstream Yiddish. From the 12th century onwards, due among other things to the influence of the nearby Rashi school, French linguistic elements were aggregated as well. From the 18th century onwards, some Polish elements due to immigrants blended into Yédisch-Daïtsch too.

According to C. J. Hutterer (1969), "In western and central Europe the WY dialects must have died out within a short time during the period of reforms [i.e. the movements toward Jewish emancipation] following the Enlightenment." In the 18th century, Yiddish was declining in German-speaking regions, as Jews were acculturating, and the Haskalah opposed the use of Yiddish. Preference for German grew among Jews. By the end of the 18th century, Western Yiddish was mostly out of use, though some speakers were discovered in these regions as late as the mid-20th century.

=== Eastern Yiddish ===
Eastern Yiddish is split into Northern and Southern dialects.

- Northern / Northeastern Yiddish (Litvish or "Lithuanian" Yiddish) was spoken in modern-day Lithuania, Belarus, Latvia, and portions of northeastern Poland, northern and eastern Ukraine, and western Russia.
  - Hiberno-Yiddish, spoken by Jews in Ireland, is based on this dialect.
- The Southern dialects are again subdivided:
  - Mideastern Yiddish (Central, Poylish or "Polish" Yiddish) was spoken in Poland, western Galicia (Galitsianer), and much of Hungary.
  - Southeastern Yiddish (Ukrainish or "Ukrainian" Yiddish) was spoken in Volhynia (Volinyer), Podolia (Podolyer), and Bessarabia (Besaraber, in Romania). (Note: Some authors use the term "Southeastern Yiddish" as a collective designation for both Poylish and Ukrainish while still applying the term Northeastern Yiddish to Litvish.)

Ukrainian Yiddish was the basis for standard theatre Yiddish, while Lithuanian Yiddish was the basis of standard literary and academic Yiddish. (Note: The two varieties differ slightly. Many words with /oj/ in the standard have /ej/ in Lithuanian Yiddish, e.g. וואוין = Standard /vojn/, Lithuanian /vejn/. See Katz, Dovid (1987). Grammar of the Yiddish Language. Gerald Duckworth & Co. Ltd. p. 38. ISBN 0-7156-2161-0.)

About three-quarters of contemporary Yiddish speakers speak Southern Yiddish varieties, the majority speaking Polish Yiddish. Most Hasidic communities use southern dialects, with the exception of Chabad, which uses Litvish. Many Haredim in Jerusalem, especially those who belong to the perushim community, also preserve Litvish Yiddish.

==== Udmurt Yiddish ====
In addition to Russian, Jews who settled in Udmurtia would develop dialects incorporating Udmurt and Tatar vocabulary (Udmurtish or "Udmurt" Yiddish). The Udmurt dialect has been traditionally split into two groupings.

- Central dialects, which were centered around Izhevsk, Sarapul, and Votkinsk.
- Southern dialects, which were centered around Kambarka, Alnashi, Agryz and Naberezhnye Chelny.

=== Transitional Yiddish dialects ===
Some linguists have proposed the existence of transitional dialects of Yiddish that developed in areas between Western and Eastern dialects. Transitional Yiddish is spoken in two different regions, a Western part and an Eastern part.

- The Western part (Bohemia, Moravia, west Slovakia, and west Hungary) are characterized by a Yiddish dialect which was lexically east European but phonologically west European.
- The Eastern part (the Hungarian lowlands, Transylvania, and Carpathian Rus) is a fusion of the west-Transcarpathian dialect with dialects brought by chasidic immigrants from Galicia. Transition Yiddish countries are sometimes considered jointly Eastern Yiddish countries.

=== Differences between dialects ===
The primary differences between the contemporary dialects are in the quality of stressed vowels, though there are also differences in morphology, lexicon, and grammar.

Northern dialects are more conservative in vowel quality, while southern dialects have preserved vowel quantity distinctions.

== Comparison ==
Stressed vowels in the Yiddish dialects may be understood by considering their common origins in the Proto-Yiddish sound system. Yiddish linguistic scholarship uses a system developed by M. Weinreich (1960) to indicate the descendent diaphonemes of the Proto-Yiddish stressed vowels.

Each Proto-Yiddish vowel is given a unique two-digit identifier, and its reflexes use it as a subscript, for example Southeastern o_{11} is the vowel /o/, descended from Proto-Yiddish */a/. The first digit indicates Proto-Yiddish quality (1-=*[a], 2-=*[e], 3-=*[i], 4-=*[o], 5-=*[u]), and the second refers to quantity or diphthongization (-1=short, -2=long, -3=short but lengthened early in the history of Yiddish, -4=diphthong, -5=special length occurring only in Proto-Yiddish vowel 25).

Vowels 23, 33, 43 and 53 have the same reflexes as 22, 32, 42 and 52 in all Yiddish dialects, but they developed distinct values in Middle High German; Katz (1978) argues that they should be collapsed with the -2 series, leaving only 13 in the -3 series.

Genetic sources of Yiddish dialect vowels
		Netherlandic		Polish		Lithuanian	
		Front	Back	Front	Back	Front	Back
Close	short	i _{31}	u _{52}	i _{31/51}	u _{12/13}	i _{31/32}	u _{51/52}
Close	long	iː _{32}	—N/a	iː _{32/52}	—N/a	—N/a	
Close-mid	short	—N/a	o _{51}	—N/a		—N/a	
Close-mid	long	eː _{25}	oː _{12}	eː ~ ej _{25}	oː ~ ou _{54}	—N/a	
Close-mid	diphthong	—N/a		eː ~ ej _{25}	oː ~ ou _{54}	ej _{22/24/42/44}	—N/a
Open-mid	short	ɛ _{21}	ɔ _{41}	ɛ _{21}	ɔ _{41}	ɛ _{21/25}	ɔ _{12/13/41}
Open-mid	diphthong	ɛj _{22/34}	ɔu _{42/54}	—N/a	ɔj _{42/44}	—N/a	ɔj _{54}
Open	short	a _{11/13}		a _{11}		a _{11}	
Open	long	aː _{24/44}		aː _{34}		—N/a	
Open	diphthong	—N/a		aj _{22/24}		aj _{34}	

Examples
PY	Netherlandic	Polish	Lithuanian
11 (A_{1})	alt	alt	alt
42 (O_{2})	brɔut	brɔjt	brejt
13 (A_{3})	vas	vus	vɔs
24 (E_{4})	ān	ajn	ejn
54 (U_{4})	hɔuz	hōz~ houz	hɔjz

Dialect vowel differences
Vowel (Hebrew script)	Northern Yiddish (Litvish)	Southern Yiddish (Poylish, Galitzish)	Comparison (Heb. script = NY = SY)
אָ	o [ɔ]	u [u], o [ɔ]	דאָס, זאָגן = dos, zogn = dus, zugn
אֻ, וּ	u [ʊ]	i [i]/[iː]	קוגל = kugel = kigel
ײַ	ai [aj]	ah [aː]	זײַן = zayn = zahn
אֵ, ײ	ey [ɛɪ]	ay [aj]	קלײן, צװײ = kleyn, tzvey = klayn, tzvay
ױ, וֹ	ey [ɛɪ]	oy [oj], o [oː]	ברױט = breyt = broyt
ע	e [ɛ]	ey [ej], e [ɛ]	שטעטל = shtetl = shteytl (Note: Unstressed /e/ [ə] does not change)

Some dialects have final consonant devoicing.

Merger of /ʃ/ into /s/ was common in Litvish Yiddish in previous generations. Known as Sabesdiker losn, it has been stigmatized and deliberately avoided by recent generations of Litvaks.

== Standardization efforts ==
As with many other languages with strong literary traditions, there was a more or less constant tendency toward the development of a neutral written form acceptable to the speakers of all dialects. In the early 20th century, for both cultural and political reasons, particular energy was focused on developing a modern Standard Yiddish. This contained elements from all three Eastern dialects but its phonetic attributes were predominantly based on Northeastern pronunciation. This resulted in modern Standard Yiddish phonology, without detailing the phonetic variation among the three contributing dialects or the further distinctions among the myriad local varieties that they subsume.

A useful early review of the differences between the three main Eastern dialects is provided by the Yiddish lexicographer Alexander Harkavy in a Treatise on Yiddish Reading, Orthography, and Dialectal Variations first published in 1898 together with his Yiddish-English Dictionary (Harkavy 1898).

=== Standardization controversy ===
Harkavy, like others of the early standardizers, regards Litvish as the "leading branch". That assertion has, however, been questioned by many authors and remains the subject of keen controversy. YIVO, the Jewish Scientific Institute, is often seen as the initiating agent in giving phonetic preference to Litvish, but Harkavy's work predates YIVO's and he was not exclusively describing personal preference. A broad-based study provided in the Language and Cultural Atlas of Ashkenazic Jewry (discussed in detail below under the heading Documentation) provides a clearer picture of the more recent YIVO perspective.

The heart of the debate is the priority given to the dialect with the smallest number of speakers. One of the alternative proposals put forward in the early discussion of standardizing spoken Yiddish was to base it on the pronunciation of the Southeastern dialect, which was the most widely used form in the Yiddish theatre (cf. Bühnendeutsch, the stage pronunciation, as a common designation for Standard German).

There is nothing unusual about heated debate over language planning and reform. Such normative initiatives are, however, frequently based on legislative authority – something which, with the exception of regulation in the Soviet Union, has never applied to Yiddish. It might therefore be expected that the controversy about the development of Standard Yiddish would be particularly intense.

The acrimony surrounding the extensive role played by YIVO is vividly illustrated by in remarks made by Birnbaum:

There is no standard pronunciation in Yiddish. However, the members and friends of the Yivo Institute for Jewish Research, New York, have strong views on the subject. They are convinced that Y should not differ in this respect from the great Western languages, and so they are willing to introduce a standard one. In their publications they speak as if it were already in existence, but this is wishful thinking – acceptance of their system being restricted to their circle. The original proponents of this 'standard' were speakers of the Northern dialect and so, without further ado and without discussing the matter or giving any reasons, they decided that their own pronunciation was the 'standard'. However, the man in the street knows nothing about it. If he happens to be a Southerner he does not exchange his rich phonemic system for the meagre one of the Northern dialect. He does not even know that this is 'supposed to be' the 'standard'. And if he is a Northerner, he goes on speaking as before, without realizing that he would need to change only one of his vowels in order to qualify as a speaker of the 'standard'. It is ironic that the partisans of the 'standard' – all convinced democrats – should ask the majority of Yiddish-speakers to switch over from their own pronunciation to that of a minority, comprising only a quarter of all Yiddish speakers.

— Solomon Birnbaum, 1979

Recent criticism of modern Standard Yiddish is expressed by Michael Wex in several passages in Wex 2005. Regardless of any nuance that can be applied to the consideration of these arguments, it may be noted that modern Standard Yiddish is used by very few mother-tongue speakers and is not evoked by the vast bulk of Yiddish literature. It has, however, become a norm in present-day instruction of Yiddish as a foreign language and is therefore firmly established in any discourse about the development of that language.

== Documentation ==
Between 1992 and 2000, Herzog et al. published a three-volume Language and Cultural Atlas of Ashkenazic Jewry, commonly referred to as the LCAAJ. This provides a detailed description of the phonetic elements of what is presented as an Eastern-Western dialect continuum, and mapping their geographic distribution. A more recent extensive phonetic description, also of both Eastern and Western Yiddish, was published by Neil G. Jacobs in 2005.

== See also ==
- Jewish languages
- Mordkhe Veynger

== Bibliography ==
- Birnbaum, Solomon A., Yiddish: A Survey and a Grammar, University of Toronto Press, Toronto, 1979, ISBN 0-8020-5382-3.
- Estraikh, Gennady, Soviet Yiddish: Language Planning and Linguistic Development, Clarendon Press, Oxford, 1999, ISBN 0-19-818479-4.
- Fishman, Joshua A. (ed.), Never Say Die: A Thousand Years of Yiddish in Jewish Life and Letters, Mouton Publishers, The Hague, 1981, ISBN 90-279-7978-2.
- Harkavy, Alexander, Harkavy's English-Jewish and Jewish-English Dictionary, Hebrew Publishing Company, New York, 1898. Expanded 6th ed., 1910, scanned facsimile.
- Herzog, Marvin, et al. ed., The Language and Culture Atlas of Ashkenazic Jewry, 3 vols., Max Niemeyer Verlag, Tübingen, 1992–2000, ISBN 3-484-73013-7.
- Jacobs, Neil G. (2005). Yiddish: A Linguistic Introduction. Cambridge University Press. ISBN 0-521-77215-X.
- Katz, Dovid (1978). Genetic Notes on Netherlandic Yiddish Vocalism (PDF).
- Katz, Dovid, Grammar of the Yiddish Language, Duckworth, London, 1987, ISBN 0-7156-2161-0.
- Weinreich, Uriel, College Yiddish: an Introduction to the Yiddish language and to Jewish Life and Culture, 6th revised ed., YIVO Institute for Jewish Research, New York, 1999, ISBN 0-914512-26-9.
- Wex, Michael, Born to Kvetch: Yiddish Language and Culture in All Its Moods, St. Martin's Press, New York, 2005, ISBN 0-312-30741-1.
