= List of chairmen of the State Council of the Udmurt Republic =

List of chairmen of the State Council of the Republic of Udmurtia.

This is a list of chairmen (speakers) of the Supreme Council of the Udmurt Republic:

Name	Term
Valentin Tubylov	March 31, 1992–April 1995

This is a list of chairmen (speakers) of the State Council of the Udmurt Republic:

Name	Term
Alexander Volkov	April 19, 1995–November 3, 2000
Igor Semyonov	November 28, 2000–April 6, 2003; April 23, 2003–December 2, 2007
Alexander Solovyov	December 11, 2007–October 14, 2012; October 22, 2012–April 28, 2013
Vladmir Nevostruyev	June 25, 2013–10. September 2017
Alexey Prasolov	September 26, 2017–
