= Abyshevo =

Abyshevo may refer to:

- Abyshevo, Kemerovo Oblast
- Abyshevo, Udmurtia
