= Sarapulsky Uyezd =

Sarapulsky Uyezd (Сарапульский уезд) was one of the subdivisions of the Vyatka Governorate of the Russian Empire. It was situated in the southeastern part of the governorate. Its administrative centre was Sarapul.

== Demographics ==
At the time of the Russian Empire Census of 1897, Sarapulsky Uyezd had a population of 408,058. Of these, 71.3% spoke Russian, 24.0% Udmurt, 2.6% Tatar, 1.0% Bashkir, 0.6% Mari, 0.1% Yiddish and 0.1% Estonian as their native language.
