= Valentin Tubylov =

Russian politician

Valentin Kuzmich Tubylov Валентин Кузьмич Тубылов

1st Chairman of the State Council of the Udmurt Republic
- In office March 31, 1992 – April 19, 1995
- Preceded by: Office created
- Succeeded by: Alexander Volkov

Personal details
- Born: 13 November 1935 (age 90) Mozhginsky District, Udmurt ASSR, RSFSR, Soviet Union
- Party: CPSU (1964-1991)

Valentin Kuzmich Tubylov Russian: Валентин Кузьмич Тубылов; born November 13, 1935) is a Russian former politician who served as the Chairman of the State Council of the Udmurt Republic from 1992 to 1995. He was replaced by Alexander Volkov, who would go on to become Head of Udmurtia in November 2000.

== Biography ==
An ethnic Udmurt, Tubylov was born on November 13, 1935, in the village of Malaya Kibya in Mozhginsky District, then part of the Udmurt ASSR. He graduated from the Sarapul Agricultural College in 1962, and the Izhevsk Agricultural Institute in 1969.

He adopted the Declaration of State Sovereignty of Udmurtia (September 20, 1990), the Constitution of the Udmurt Republic (December 7, 1994). Under his leadership, the transition from the Udmurt Autonomous Soviet Socialist Republic to the Udmurt Republic was undertaken.

From 1997 to 2009, he was the President of the Udmurt Kenesh organization, and since 1999, the newspaper "Gerd". in 2000, he stood against the exclusion of the word "sovereign" from the Constitution of the Udmurt Republic.
