= Alexander Solovyov (politician) =

Russian politician (1950–2023)

- Александр Соловьёв
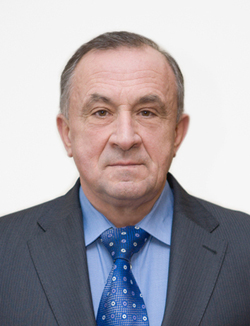

2nd Head of the Udmurt Republic
- In office 19 February 2014 – 4 April 2017
- Preceded by: Alexander Volkov
- Succeeded by: Alexander Brechalov (acting)

Russian Federation Senator from the Udmurt Republic
- In office April 2013 – 26 February 2014
- Preceded by: Viktor Shudegov
- Succeeded by: Lyubov Glebova

Personal details
- Born: 18 June 1950 Alnashi, Udmurt ASSR, Russian SFSR, USSR
- Died: 24 July 2023 (aged 73)
- Party: United Russia
- Profession: Architect

Alexander Vasilyevich Solovyov (Udmurt and Russian: Александр Васильевич Соловьёв; 18 June 1950 – 24 July 2023) was a Russian politician who was the Head of Udmurtia from 2014 to 2017.

Solovyov died on 24 July 2023, at the age of 73. He is buried in the Southern Cemetery of Izhevsk.

== Biography ==
Alexander Solovyov was born in the selo of Alnashi of Alnashsky District in Udmurt ASSR.

1993 – he graduated from Izhevsk Agricultural Institute (mechanical engineer).

1968-1969 – a shaper, a slinger at a metallurgical plant in Izhevsk.

1969-1970 – service in Soviet Armed Forces.

1972-1979 – milling machine operator, foundry worker, process engineer, master of Izhevsk Electromechanical Plant.

From 1979 – he worked at the Udmurtavtodor production association.

1979-1983 – mechanic, foreman, head of the Alnash road construction department No.5.

1983-1987 – Head of the Glazovsky road repair and construction site, then Glazovsky Road Construction Department No.6.

1987-1993 – Head of Izhevsk Road Construction Department No.1.

1993-2003 – Head of the state institution "Management of highways of the Udmurt Republic" of the State Road Management Service of Russia.

== Awards and honours ==
- 1996 – Honored Builder of the Russian Federation
- 2010 – Order of Friendship
- Honorary Road Worker of Russia

== Notes ==
Political offices
Preceded by Alexander Volkov	Head of the Udmurt Republic; 2014–2017	Succeeded by Alexander Brechalov (acting)
