= Grakhovsky District =

Grakhovsky District Граховский район
- District

Other transcription(s)
  - Udmurt: Грах ёрос
- Flag Coat of arms
- Location of Grakhovsky District in the Udmurt Republic
- Coordinates: 56°2′41″N 51°57′19″E
- Country: Russia
- Federal subject: Udmurt Republic
- Established: 15 July 1929
- Administrative center: Grakhovo

Area
  - Total: 967.7 km^{2} (373.6 sq mi)

Population (2010 Census)
  - Total: 9,354
  - Density: 9.666/km^{2} (25.04/sq mi)
  - Urban: 0%
  - Rural: 100%

Administrative structure
  - Administrative divisions: 8 selsoviet
  - Inhabited localities: 41 rural localities

Municipal structure
  - Municipally incorporated as: Grakhovsky Municipal District
  - Municipal divisions: 0 urban settlements, 8 rural settlements
- Time zone: UTC+4 (MSK+1)
- OKTMO ID: 94612000
- Website: http://grahovo.udmurt.ru/

Grakhovsky District (Russian: Гра́ховский райо́н; Udmurt: Грах ёрос, Grah joros) is an administrative and municipal district (raion), one of the twenty-five in the Udmurt Republic, Russia. It is located in the southwest of the republic. The area of the district is 967.7 square kilometers (373.6 sq mi). Its administrative center is the rural locality (a selo) of Grakhovo. Population: 9,354 (2010 Census); 10,879 (2002 Census); 11,699 (1989 Soviet census). The population of Grakhovo accounts for 34.7% of the district's total population.

== Geographic information ==
The district is bordered by Kiznersky District of Udmurtia in the West, Mozhginsky District of Udmurtia in the North, Alnashsky District in the East and the Republic of Tatarstan in the South. An eastern part of the district is located in the Mozhga Hills and a western part of the district is located in the Umyak River's valley. On territory of the district there are rivers: Umyak, Bolshoy Syryan, Yaga, Adamka, Kuzebayka, Yurashka (tributary of the Toyma), Yurashka (tributary of the Adamka), Sayka, Vozzhayka, Kokshanka, Tylovayka and Eryksa.

The area of the district is 967.74 square kilometers. The woodiness of the district is 35.1 %.

== Population ==
Population Dynamics of Grakhovsky District (1959-2010)

Year	Pop.	±%
1959	22,631	—
1970	16,401	−27.5%
1979	13,754	−16.1%

Year	Pop.	±%
1989	11,699	−14.9%
2002	10,879	−7.0%
2010	9,354	−14.0%
