= Mordkovitch =

Mordkovitch (Russian: Мордкович, romanized: Mordkovich) is a Russian Jewish patronymic surname derived from the Jewish given name Mordka, a diminutive of "Mordechai". Romanian equivalent: Mordcovici. Notable people with this surname include:

- Hélène Viannay, née Mordkovitch (1917–2006), French Resistance member
- Lydia Mordkovitch (1944–2014), Russian violinist
