= Kommunizme =

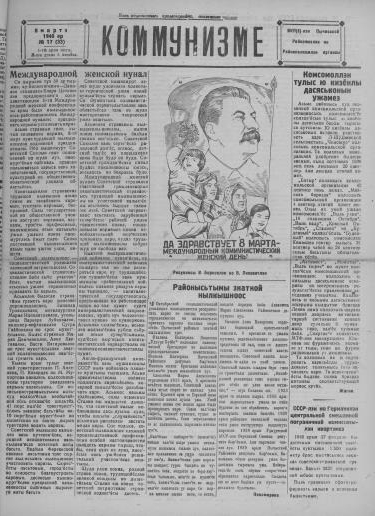
- March 8, 1940 issue of Kommunizme
- Native name: Коммунизме
- Founded: October 17, 1939
- Ceased publication: December 14, 1956
- Political alignment: Communist
- Language: Udmurt language
- Headquarters: Pychas
- Sister newspapers: K Kommunizmu

Kommunizme (Udmurt: Коммунизме, 'Towards Communism') was an Udmurt language newspaper published from Pychas, Udmurt Autonomous Soviet Socialist Republic, Soviet Union between October 17, 1939 and December 14, 1956. It was the organ of the Pychas District Committee of the Communist Party of the Soviet Union and the Pychas District Soviet.

All in all some 915 issues of Kommunizme were published - 16 issues in 1939, 93 issues in 1940, 94 issues in 1941, 53 issues in 1942, 42 issues in 1943, 41 issues in 1944, 33 issues in 1945, around 45 issues in 1946, 49 issues in 1947, 50 issues in 1948, 51 issues in 1949, 49 issues in 1950, 45 issues in 1951, 78 issues in 1952, 100 issues in 1953, 101 issues in 1954, again 101 issues in 1955 and 98 issues in 1956. During its earlier phase, monthly subscriptions were sold for 50 kopeks. During 1955 and 1956 individual issues were sold for 10 kopeks.

Between May 9, 1944 and December 13, 1956 a Russian language newspaper similarly named K Kommunizmu was published in Pychas. From 1952 onward the numbering of the issues of Kommunizme and K Kommunizmu was identical.
