= Litvish (disambiguation) =

Lithuanian Jews is a branch of Judaism traced to the Jews from the 18th century Grand Duchy of Lithuania.

Litvish may also refer to:

- Litvish, a Yiddish dialect characteristic of Lithuanian Jews, also known as Northeastern Yiddish
- Litvishe, non-Hasidic Haredi Jews
- Litvak, any Jew from Lithuania; see History of the Jews in Lithuania
