= Head of the Udmurt Republic =

Highest-ranking official in Udmurtia, Russia

- Удмурт Элькунлэн Тӧроез (Udmurt); Глава Удмуртской Республики (Russian)
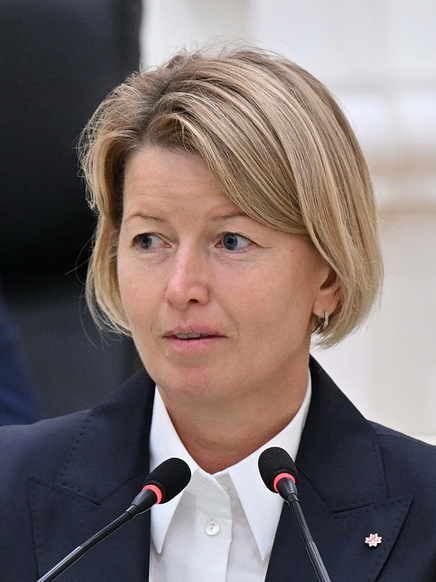
- Incumbent; Olga Abramova; Acting since 29 July 2026
- Executive branch of the Udmurt Republic
- Style: Her Excellency; The Honorable
- Type: Governor; Head of state; Head of government
- Residence: Izhevsk
- Nominator: Political parties
- Appointer: Direct elections
- Term length: 5 years
- Constituting instrument: Constitution of Udmurtia, Section 6
- Formation: 3 November 2000
- First holder: Alexander Volkov
- Website: Official website

The position of the Head of the Udmurt Republic (Note: Russian: Глава Удмуртской Республики, romanized: Glava Udmurtskoy Respubliki; Udmurt: Удмурт Элькунлэн Тӧроез, romanized: Udmurt El′kunlen Töroez) is the highest office within the Government of the Udmurt Republic in Russia. The Head is elected by citizens of Russia residing in the republic. Term of service is five years.

== List ==
=== Preceding offices (1990–2000) ===
Before the presidency was created in 2000, Udmurtia was effectively governed as a parliamentary republic, with speaker of the parliament exercising head of state duties.

Political parties and groups:

Independent
Communist Party of the Soviet Union
"Udmurtia" bloc
"Concord" bloc/Udmurt Council
Fatherland

Portrait	Head of state	Term of office	Portrait	Head of government	Term of office	Election
	Valentin Tubylov (born 1935) (Note: Chairman of the Supreme Soviet.)	14 April 1990 – 19 April 1995 (lost re-election)		Nikolay Mironov (1936–1999) (Note: Chairman of the Council of Ministers.)	14 April 1990 – 24 June 1993 (resigned)	1990
	Valentin Tubylov (born 1935)	14 April 1990 – 19 April 1995 (lost re-election)		Alexander Volkov (1951–2017) (Note: Chairman of the Government.)	24 June 1993 – 19 April 1995	1990
	Alexander Volkov (1951–2017) (Note: Chairman of the State Council.)	19 April 1995 – 3 November 2000		Pavel Vershinin (born 1949)	26 April 1995 – 22 April 1999 (was not renominated)	1995
	Alexander Volkov (1951–2017)	19 April 1995 – 3 November 2000		Nikolay Ganza (born 1946)	22 April 1999 – 3 November 2000	1999

=== President/Head of the Republic (2000–present) ===
No.	Portrait	Name (born–died)	Term of office			Political party	Elected	Ref.
No.	Portrait	Name (born–died)	Took office	Left office	Time in office	Political party	Elected	Ref.
1		Alexander Volkov (1951–2017)	3 November 2000	19 February 2014	13 years, 108 days	Fatherland	2000; 2004; 2009 (Note: Appointed by the President of Russia with the consent of the State Council.)	
1		Alexander Volkov (1951–2017)	3 November 2000	19 February 2014	13 years, 108 days	United Russia	2000; 2004; 2009	
–		Alexander Solovyov (1950–2023)	19 February 2014	22 September 2014	215 days	United Russia	– (Note: Acting head of the republic)	
2		Alexander Solovyov (1950–2023)	22 September 2014	4 April 2017	2 years, 194 days	United Russia	2014	
–		Alexander Brechalov (born 1973)	4 April 2017	18 September 2017	167 days	Independent	–	
3		Alexander Brechalov (born 1973)	18 September 2017	29 July 2026	8 years, 314 days	United Russia	2017; 2022	
–		Olga Abramova (born 1981)	29 July 2026	Incumbent	115 days	United Russia	–	

== Elections ==
The latest election for the office was held on 11 September 2022.
