= Alnashsky District =

Alnashsky District Алнашский район (Russian)
- District

Other transcription(s)
  - Udmurt: Алнаш ёрос
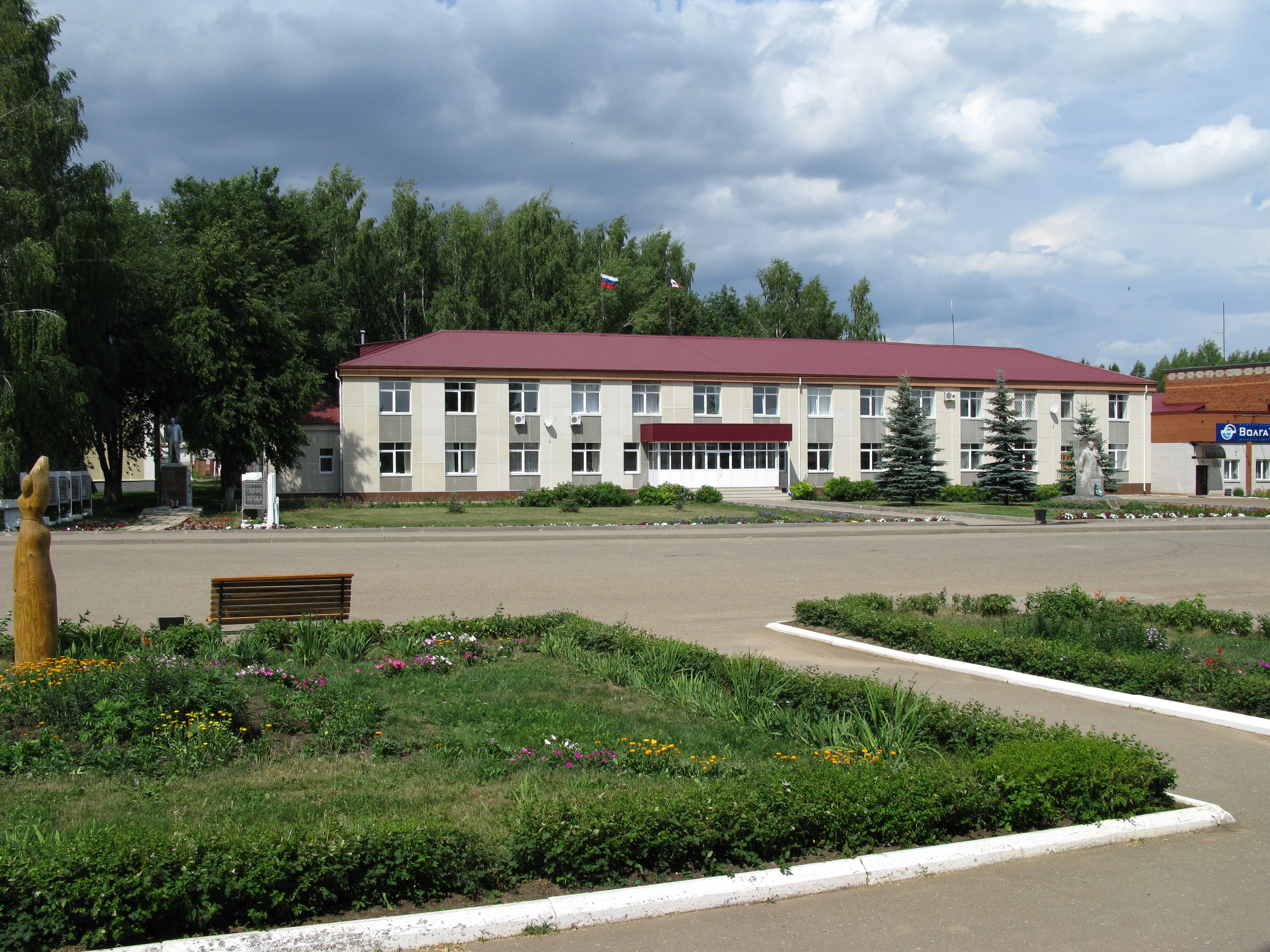
- View of Alnashi, the administrative center of the district

- Flag Coat of arms
- Location of Alnashsky District in the Udmurt Republic
- Coordinates: 56°11′N 52°28′E
- Country: Russia
- Federal subject: Udmurt Republic
- Established: 15 July 1929
- Administrative center: Alnashi

Area
  - Total: 896 km^{2} (346 sq mi)

Population (2010 Census)
  - Total: 20,403
  - Density: 22.8/km^{2} (59.0/sq mi)
  - Urban: 0%
  - Rural: 100%

Administrative structure
  - Administrative divisions: 12 selsoviet
  - Inhabited localities: 81 rural localities

Municipal structure
  - Municipally incorporated as: Alnashsky Municipal District
  - Municipal divisions: 0 urban settlements, 12 rural settlements
- Time zone: UTC+4 (MSK+1)
- OKTMO ID: 94602000
- Website: http://www.alnashi.udmurt.ru/

Alnashsky District (Russian: Ална́шский райо́н; Udmurt: Алнаш ёрос, Alnaš joros) is an administrative and municipal district (raion), one of the twenty-five in the Udmurt Republic, Russia. It is located in the south of the republic. The area of the district is 896 square kilometers (346 sq mi). Its administrative center is the rural locality (a selo) of Alnashi.

== Geographic information ==
The district is bordered by Grakhovsky District of Udmurtia in the west, Mozhginsky District of Udmurtia in the north, also by Agryzsky District of the Republic of Tatarstan in the east and by Mendeleevsky District of Tatarstan in the south-west. The area of the district is 896 square kilometers.

=== Relief and Soil ===
The district is located in the Mozhga Hills which is a weak-high plain with calm character of relief. At the preagricultural time in the vegetative cover fir-spruce forests with broad-leaved trees (lime tree, maple, oak, elm, common hazel) were dominated. At the present time, second aspen-birchen and lime forests are dominant. The woodiness - 18,0 %.

The district is dominated by Alfisols and sod-calcareous loamy soils that have high natural fertility and are some of the best soils in Udmurtia.

=== Climate ===
The average annual temperature varies between + 2,3-2,6 °C. The average temperature in January is -14,0-14,2 °C, in July is + 18,9-19,2 °C. The amount of active temperature is 2000–2100 °C. The frost-free period lasts about 130–135 days per year, the annual rainfall is 490–530 mm.

=== Hydrology ===
The district is located in the basin of the Kama River, the southern boundary of the district runs along the banks of the Nizhnekamsk reservoir. On the territory of Alnashsky District there are rivers - Varzi, Toyma, Alnashka, Varali, Varaga, Utchanka and many others. The average annual runoff of rivers is 4.5-5.0 L / s*km^{2}, the density of the river network - 0.58 km / km^{2}. At the beginning of 2009, the water fund of the district is 677 hectares.

== History ==
The Alnashsky District was established July 15, 1929, from 15 village Soviets (Selsoviets, or village councils) of the Alnashskaya volost and the Bolshekib'inskaya volost of the Mozhginsky Uezd. At the time in the structure of the district there were included Azamatovsky, Alnashsky, Asanovsky, Bayteryakovsky, Bolshekib'insky, Varzi-Yatchinsky, Voznesensky, Gondyrevsky, Ivanovsky, Kadikovsky, Kucherenovsky, Muvazhinsky, Piseevsky, Staroutchansky, Tutashevsky, Udmurt-Toymobashsky and Chemoshur-Kuyuksky village Soviets. In 1932, in the structure of the district from Tatarstan the Staroyum'insky village Soviet was additionally passed. In 1937 during the formation of the Pychassky District some village Soviets of the Alnashsky District were passed into its composition. In 1954, there was the consolidation of village Soviets, their number reduced to 10. In 1963, the district was abolished and its territory became a part of the Mozhginsky District, but in 1965 the Alnashsky District was restored.

The modern structure of the district was formed as a result of the municipal reform in 2006. At the moment, the district consists of 12 rural settlements.

Rural settlement	Administrative center	The number of inhabited localities	Population (January 1, 2015)	Area, hectare (2012)
municipal formation "Azamatovskoe"	Azamatovo	10	1260	8868
municipal formation "Alnashskoe"	Alnashi	1	6047	1305
municipal formation "Asanovskoe"	Nizhnee Asanovo	5	895	5866
municipal formation "Bayteryakovskoe"	Bayteryakovo	11	1221	10198
municipal formation "Varzi-Yatchinskoe"	Varzi-Yatchi	6	1884	8203
municipal formation "Kuzebaevskoe"	Kuzebaevo	5	857	7516
municipal formation "Muvazhinskoe"	Muvazhi	5	653	4179
municipal formation "Piseevskoe"	Piseevo	3	847	6268
municipal formation "Romashkinskoe"	Alnashi	15	1260	13905
municipal formation "Staroutchanskoe"	Staryy Utchan	10	1050	9177
municipal formation "Tekhnikumovskoe"	Asanovsky sovkhoz-tekhnikum	3	1650	3352
municipal formation "Udmurt-Toymobashskoe"	Udmurtsky Toymobash	7	1159	10763

== Population ==
Population: 20,403 (2010 census); 22,258 (2002 Census); 21,931 (1989 Soviet census). The population of Alnashi accounts for 30.9% of the district's total population. The average population density - 22.77 pers. / km^{2}. The district occupies the 11th place in population and 4th place in density among the municipal districts of Udmurtia. On January 1, 2013, from 81 Inhabited localities of the district 7 had no permanent population.

In 2011, the birth rate was 18,3 ‰, mortality rate - 15,4 ‰, the natural population growth - 2,9 ‰. The population of the district continues to decline due to migration loss (the difference between the number of departures and arrivals on the territory of the district), in 2011 the migration population loss amounted to 511 people. The total number of pensioners in the district is 5440 persons, youth from 18 to 29 years - 5490 persons, voters - 15900 persons.

=== Ethnic composition ===
As a result of the 2002 census, among the district population Udmurts turned out 81.7%, Russians - 12.2%, Tatars - 3.4%, Mari - 2.1%. The Alnashsky District is one of 16 rural district of the Udmurt Republic where Udmurts make up the majority, as well as one of the four districts of compact residence of Mari people. Besides, the Alnashsky District along with the Grakhovsky District and the Kiznersky District is the residence territory of the Kryashens in the rural area of Udmurtia.

=== Jewish community ===
Of the Jews of Udmurtia, practically all resided in the Alnashsky Raion. They spoke Udmurtish, which is a dialect of Yiddish (it was very common for Yiddish to adopt characteristics of the local language which is why so many dialects exist), but they also spoke Russian, Tatar, and/or Udmurt. The Ashkenazi Jews in the Alnashsky District first appeared in the early 20th century (in the 1910s and 1920s), in addition to Subbotniks (ethnic Russians who were Jewish by religion) who periodically came on vacation or work. In the 1940–1960s, the max amount of Jews was 25-35 people, owing to five to seven Ashkenazi Jewish families: the Weissbergs, Maltsevs, and Kuznetsovs from the village (село) of Alnashi; the Abramovs from the village (деревня) of Garga; and the Schlossers from the village (selo) of Varzi-Yatchi. The Alnashsky District's Jewry celebrated all Jewish holydays except for Tu Bishvat. The most revered feasts were Passover (Pesach), Simchat Torah (Simches To(y)reh), Yom Kippur (Yom Kipper), Hanukkah and Purim. The Udmurts of the district often mistook the Jews for Russians, but sometimes for Russified Germans or Udmurts. By the 1980s, nearly all of the Alnashsky Jews had practically left the Soviet Union, but as a result of inter-ethnic members of ethnic Udmurts and ethnic Jewish families, 'a few Jews still lived in the district;' these families included the Rogovers, Ivanovs, and a few others.

== Sights ==
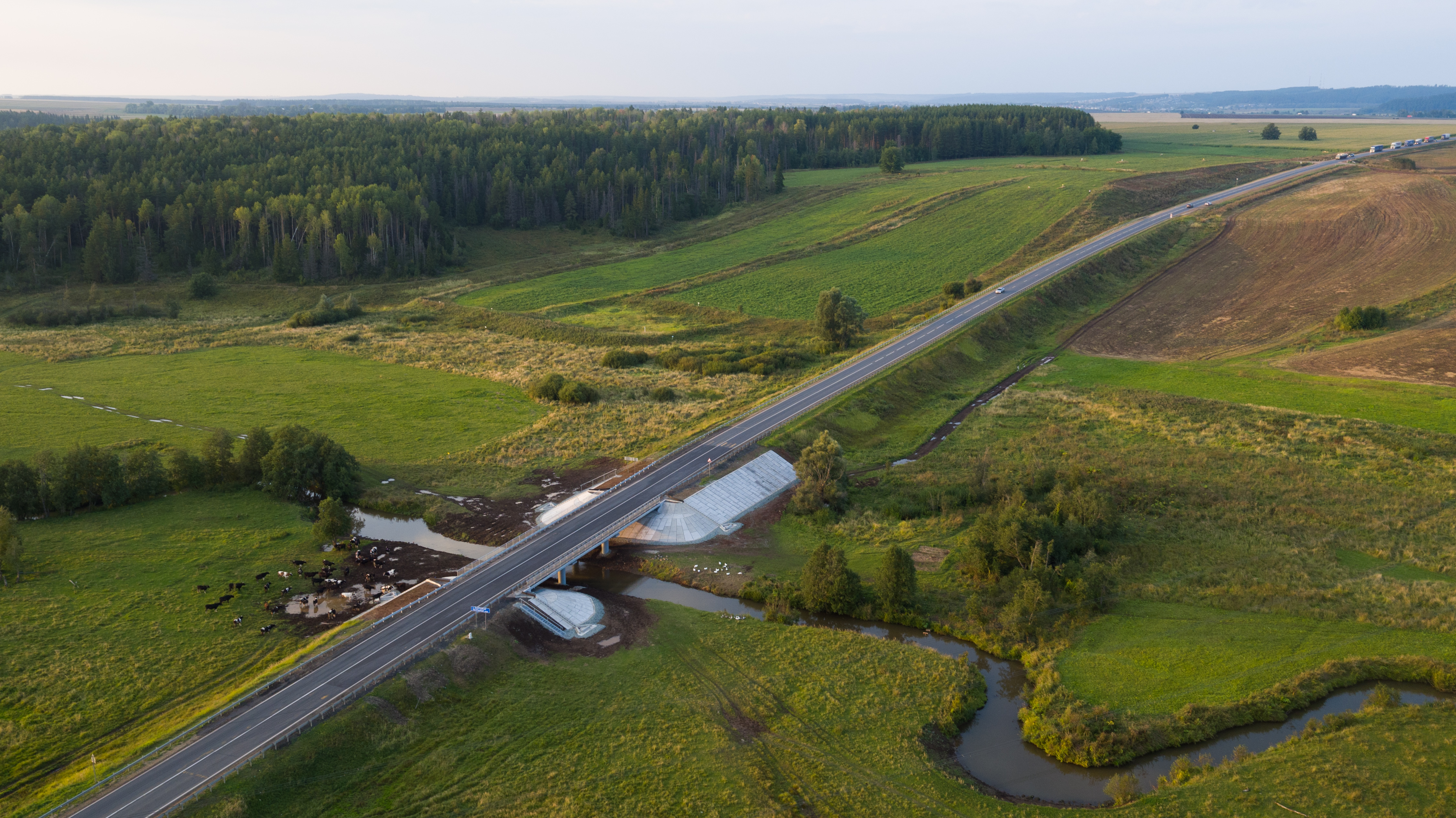
The photo shows the M7 highway and its bridge over Koltymak river in Alnashsky District.

On the territory of Alnashsky District, there are the following types of historic, natural and cultural monuments:

1) Protected areas of the Alnashsky District:

- The Varzi-Yatchi sanatorium is a unique therapeutic mud bath. It was founded in the 19th century.
- The northern peatbog of Varzi-Yatchi mineral therapeutic muds.
- The southern peatbog of Varzi-Yatchi mineral therapeutic muds.
- The Kuzebaevo peatbog.
- The Muvazhi peatbog.
- The Varzibash peatbog.
- The Varzino-Alexeevo peatbog.
- The Il'insky spring from the village (derevnya) of Il'inskoe.
- The spring "Moshchnyy" near from the village (derevnya) of Rozhdestvenskoe.
- The Karashurka River is a spawning-ground of brown trout (Salmo trutta morfa fario (Linnaeus, 1758)).
- The Nizhne-Syr'ezskoe urochishche where there is a large diversity of species composition of herbs.

2) Monuments of architecture:

- The Svyato-Troitsky temple in the village (selo) of Alnashi. It was built in 1836.
- The Svyato-Nikolsky temple in the village (selo) of Varzi-Yatchi.
- The wooden church in the village (selo) of Klyuchovka.
- The wooden mosque in the village (derevnya) of Tatarsky Toymobash.

3) Monuments of folk architecture:

- The wooden windmill in the village (derevnya) of Shadrasak-Kib'ya. It was built in the 19th century.
- The peasant's house of the Dmitrievs family in the village (derevnya) of Kuzebaevo. It was built in the 19th century.
- The peasant's house of the Speranskys family in the village (derevnya) of Muvazhi. It was built in the 19th century.
- The building of the primary school in the village (derevnya) of Yattsaz. It was built in the 19th century.
- The house of clergyman in the village (selo) of Alnashi. It was built in the 19th century. The address of the house is 427880, Russia, Udmurtia, Alnashi, Sadovaya Str., 4.

4) Historic Burials:

- The grave of the first Udmurt woman poet Ashalchi Oki (real name Lina Grigorevna Vekshina; 1898–1973) is located in the cemetery of the village (selo) of Alnashi.
- The grave of the Udmurtia national poet Herman Alekseevich Khodyrev (1932–1995).

5) Sacral territories of the three pagan religious formation of southern udmurts (Lud-vyzhy, Bulda-vyzhy, Byd'z'ym kua-vyzhy) from near the village (derevnya) of Kuzebaevo where until now the village inhabitants collectively celebrates udmurt pagan holidays (without interruptions since the beginning of the pagan practices on those territories). This feature of the village that makes it a unique place is the rare case of preservation of ethnic religion in Europe. The Jews called the village of Kuzebaevo וואָסיאַשןדאָרף vös'ašndorf [vəˈsʲaʃ(ə)ndɔʁf] < Yiddish vös'ašn- "priestly, sacerdotal (the word was used only in relation to udmurt pagan priests)" < udmurt vös'as' "pagan priest in udmurt ethnic religion" + Yiddish dorf "village".
