= Alexander Alexandrovich Volkov (politician) =

Russian politician (1951–2017)

Alexander Volkov
- Александр Волков
- Volkov in 2012

Russian Federation Senator from the Udmurt Republic
- In office 17 March 2014 – 20 May 2017
- Preceded by: Alexander Solovyov
- Succeeded by: Yury Fedorov

1st President of the Udmurt Republic
- In office 3 November 2000 – 19 February 2014
- Preceded by: Post Established
- Succeeded by: Aleksandr Solovyov

Personal details
- Born: 25 December 1951 Bryansk, RSFSR, USSR
- Died: 20 May 2017 (aged 65) Germany
- Party: United Russia
- Spouse: Nina Alexandrovna Volkova
- Children: 2
- Profession: Politician

Alexander Alexandrovich Volkov (Udmurt and Russian: Александр Александрович Волков; 25 December 1951 – 20 May 2017) was the President of the Udmurt Republic. As President, Volkov was the highest official in the Udmurt Republic, the head of the republic's highest executive body, and leader of its two million citizens. Volkov took office November 3, 2000, for a five-year term after the first presidential elections in the Udmurt Republic took place on October 15, 2000. Prior to the elections, Volkov was the speaker of the Udmurtia Republican Legislature.

== Personal life ==
Born into a worker's large family, Alexander Volkov graduated from a technical school and then worked as a foreman, chief engineer, and head of a construction department while studying at the Polytechnic Institute.

Volkov was an experienced and flexible regional politician whose 2000 election as President of the Udmurt Republic was "not exactly a birthday present for the Kremlin," according to political consultant Igor Mintoussov.

The danger of terrorism was the main concern of many among Volkov's constituents, especially for the 600,000 residents of Izhevsk, where Volkov occupied a palace and where Russia's oldest armaments factory is located, about 1,300 km east of Moscow. Surrounding rural regions are relatively impoverished and were said to turn to Volkov and the Udmurtia Legislature for support.

Along with Udmurt technical experts, Volkov negotiated with Gazprom, Russia's largest natural gas extractor, in collaborative efforts to develop the region's gas supply system and establishing a centralized gas distribution company.

In President Volkov's most recent State of the Union address, he expressed appreciation that religious and interconfessional relations were stable last year, noting reconstruction began last year on the Saint Mikhail Cathedral, and that "this event is extremely outstanding." Volkov also stressed, "The growth of investment into economics of the Republic was and is the main task of the Government."

Volkov died on 20 May 2017 in Germany, where he was being treated at a clinic.

== Public image ==
There was a long-running conflict between Volkov and Zolotoya Provintsiya since his tenure as the parliamentary speaker of Udmurtia. Volkov was named 'Man of the Year' in a contest initially billed as 'Sex Symbol of the Year'. The next day, the publication hit the newsstands with a collage featuring the body of Michelangelo's David fitted with Volkov's head. Volkov found the image insulting and initiated a challenge that made its way to the Republican Constitutional Court. Zolotaya Provintsiya was charged with pornography, libel and invasion of privacy.

== Honours and awards ==
- Order of Merit for the Fatherland 3rd class
- Order of Merit for the Fatherland 4th class
- Order of Friendship
- Medal "In Commemoration of the 850th Anniversary of Moscow"
- Medal "In Commemoration of the 300th Anniversary of Saint Petersburg"
- Honoured Builder of the Russian Federation
- Honoured Engineer of the Russian Federation

== Personal life ==
Volkov was married to Nina Volkova and has two children. Volkov is also the grandfather of four children. His son, Andrey, is a notable alumni from the Izhevsk State Technical University, and his daughter, Vera is an attorney. His hobbies were football, fishing, skiing, tennis, and spending some time helping out in the garden. Volkov was notably a very experienced musician, as he could play the accordion. When on holiday, Volkov usually went to Bryansk to meet his family. Volkov was fluent in Russian and could speak some English.

Political offices
| Preceded by Position Created | President of Udmurt Republic; 2000–2014 | Succeeded by Aleksandr Solovyov |
