= Motke =

Motke, Mordke, Mordkhe, or Mordka are Jewish given names, diminutives of Mordechai. Notable people referred to as Motke include:

- Aaron Kosminski born Aron Mordke Kozmiński
- Mordka Towbin
- Mordka Mendel Grossman
- Motke Rosenthal, or Márk Rózsavölgyi (1787-1848), Jewish Hungarian composer and violinist
- Mordechai (Motke) Maklef (1920–1978), Chief of Staff of the Israel Defense Forces
- Motke Chabad (19th century), Jewish Lithuanian jester from Vilnius
- Mordka Mendel Grossman (1913-1945), photographer and worker in the Statistical Department of the Litzmannstadt Ghetto
- Mordka was the birth given name of Mark Zamenhof (1837-1907)
- Mordkhe Schaechter (1927-2007), Yiddish linguist
- Mordkhe Veynger (1890–1929), Soviet-Jewish linguist

== Fictional characters ==
- Mottke the Thief, a 1915 novel and a 1917 play by Sholem Asch
- Motke the Angel of Death, a 1926 novel by Ilya Selvinsky
