= Grakhovo =

Grakhovo Грахово
- Selo
- Flag Coat of arms
- Interactive map of Grakhovo
- Location of Grakhovo Grakhovo (Udmurt Republic)
- Coordinates: 56°03′N 51°54′E
- Country: Russia
- Federal subject: Udmurtia
- Administrative district: Grakhovsky District
- Founded: 1813

Population (2010 Census)
  - Total: 3,245
  - Estimate (2021): 3,458 (+6.6%)

Administrative status
  - Capital of: Grakhovsky District
- Time zone: UTC+4 (MSK+1)
- Postal code: 427730
- OKTMO ID: 94612422101

Grakhovo (Russian: Гра́хово; Udmurt: Грах, Grah) is a rural locality (a selo) and the administrative center of Grakhovsky District in the Udmurt Republic, Russia. Population: 3,245 (2010 census); 3,438 (2002 census); 3,350 (1989 Soviet census).
