= Vladimir Sarayev =

Soviet footballer (1936–2010)

Personal information
- Full name: Vladimir Zosimovich Sarayev
- Date of birth: 28 April 1936
- Place of birth: Sarapul, Udmurtia, USSR
- Date of death: 18 April 2010 (aged 73)
- Place of death: Moscow, Russia
- Position: Defender

Senior career*
Years	Team	Apps	(Gls)
1961	Zenit Izhevsk	?	
1964–1968	FC Torpedo Moscow	119	(1)

International career
1965–1967	USSR	2	(0)
- * Club domestic league appearances and goals

Vladimir Zosimovich Sarayev (Russian: Владимир Зосимович Сараев; 28 April 1936 – 18 April 2010) was a Soviet-Russian football player.

== Honours ==
- Soviet Top League winner: 1965.

== International career ==
Sarayev made his debut for USSR on 27 June 1965 in a 1966 FIFA World Cup qualifier against Denmark. He was not selected for the final tournament squad.
