= Berry-Strawberry =

- Directed by: Piotr Pałgan
- Written by: Darali Leli
- Produced by: Piotr Pałgan
- Starring: Elena Frolova, Konstantin Nikitin, Irina Krestyaninova, Leonid Gusev, Galina Volkova, Yuriy Eroshkin, Roman Boltachev, Sergei Nagovitsyn
- Cinematography: Dominik Pałgan
- Edited by: Wojtek Kaniewski
- Distributed by: Inwis kinopottonni
- Release date: 17 March 2011
- Running time: 95 minutes
- Country: Russia
- Language: Udmurt

Berry-Strawberry (Udmurt: Узы-Боры, translit. Uzy-Bory; Russian: Ягода-Клубника, translit. Yagoda-Klubnika) is a 2011 comedy film in the Udmurt language directed by Piotr Pałgan based on a story by Darali Leli, who wrote the screenplay. The film was produced by Udmurt-Polish "Inwis kinopottonni". Before the film was released, the history of Udmurt cinema was that of only two films, "The Rivals" (1929) and "The Shadow of Alangasar" (1994). The film's budget has not been revealed.

== Cast ==
Elena Frolova, Konstantin Nikitin, Irina Krestyaninova, Leonid Gusev, Galina Volkova, Yuriy Eroshkin, Roman Boltachev, Sergei Nagovitsyn, Nikolai Smirnov, Anna Smirnova, Lyubov Kiseleva, Anatoly Galihanov, Maria Imbirnaya, Maxim Knyazev, Anastasia Petrova, Elena Baykova, Alexander Korenkov, as well as group MALPAN and villagers Purogurt.
