= Udmurt dunne =

Удмурт дунне
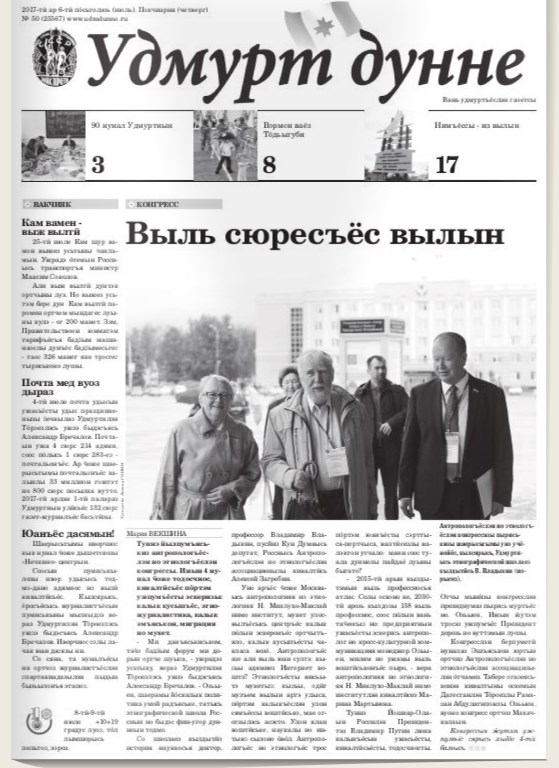
- Type: general broadsheet
- Owner: Government of Udmurtia
- Founded: 1915
- Language: Udmurt
- Headquarters: ul. Karla Marksa, 274; Izhevsk
- Circulation: c. 12,500
- Website: www.udmdunne.ru

Udmurt Dunne (Udmurt: Удмурт дунне, The Udmurt World) is the main Udmurt language newspaper.

It is printed four times a week, and is the successor of the Soviet-era Sovetskoi Udmurtia (Udmurt: Советской Удмуртия), which received the Order of the Badge of Honour in 1968.
