= St. Michael's Cathedral (Izhevsk) =

Russian Orthodox cathedral

Coordinates: 56°50′58.07″N 53°12′19.04″E

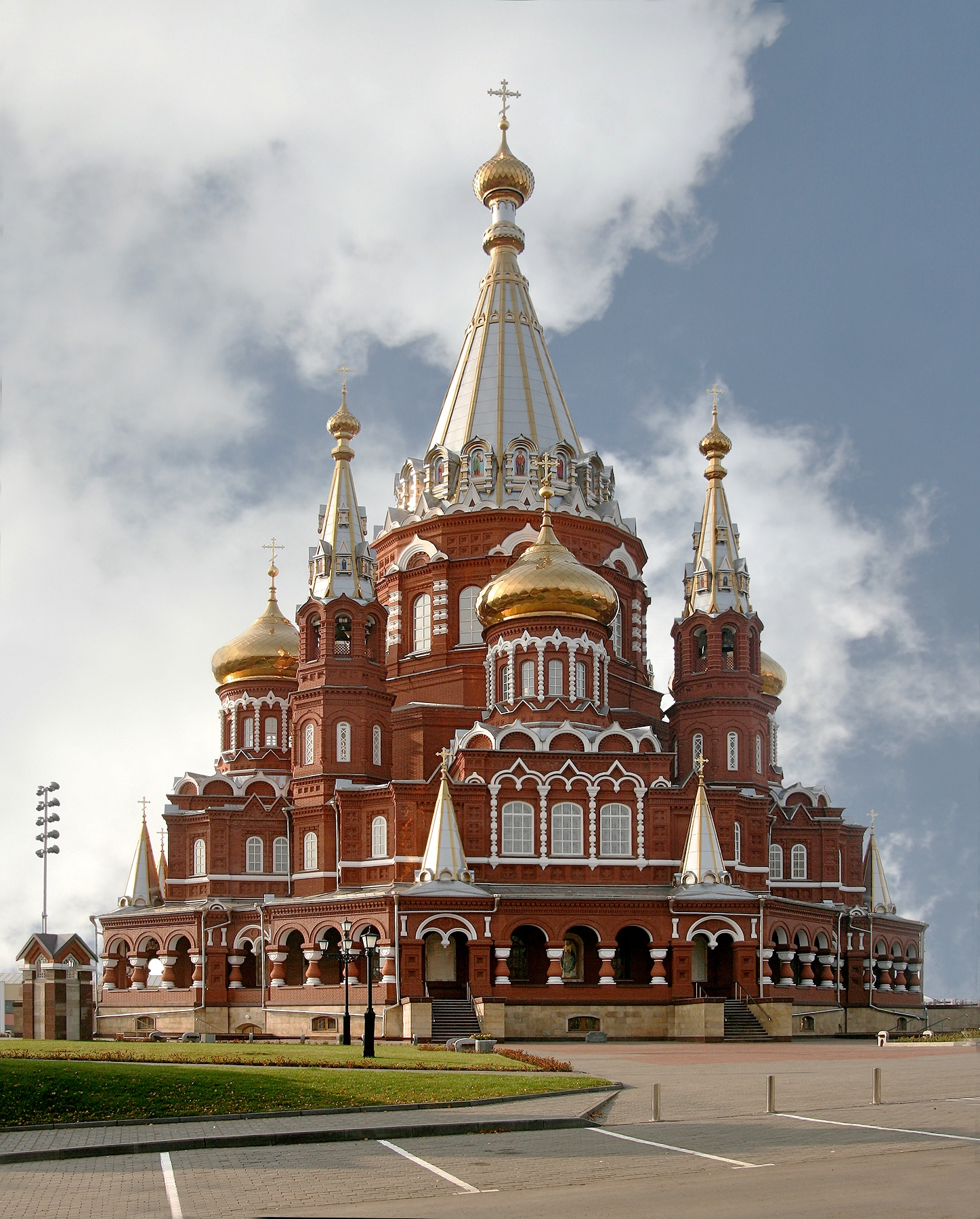
St. Michael's Cathedral in Izhevsk

Saint Michael's Cathedral (Собор святого Архистратига Михаила) in Izhevsk rivals the older Alexander Nevsky Cathedral as the main Orthodox church of Udmurtia in Russia.

Its Russian Revival design belongs to Ivan Charushin, a little-known 19th-century architect from Vyatka. The red-brick church is capped with a tent-like roof that rises to a height of 67 metres. It is encircled by several massive chapels with gilded bulbous domes and slender candle-like belfries. The porches have sharply pitched roofs in the manner of the Muscovite churches of the 17th century.

The Izhevsk arms factory owed its rise partly to the involvement of Grand Duke Mikhail Pavlovich, whose patron saint was Michael the Archangel. The factory's employees contributed one percent of their wages to a fund set up to finance the construction of a large church to this military saint.

The cathedral was erected between 1897 and 1915, only to be demolished by the Soviets in 1937. It was rebuilt to Charushin's original designs in 2004–2007.

== Gallery ==
=== History ===
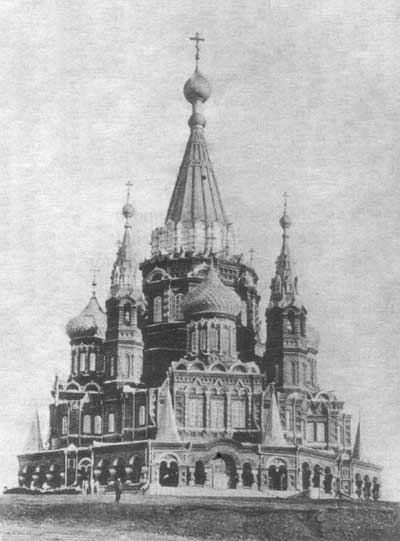
between 1897 and 1907

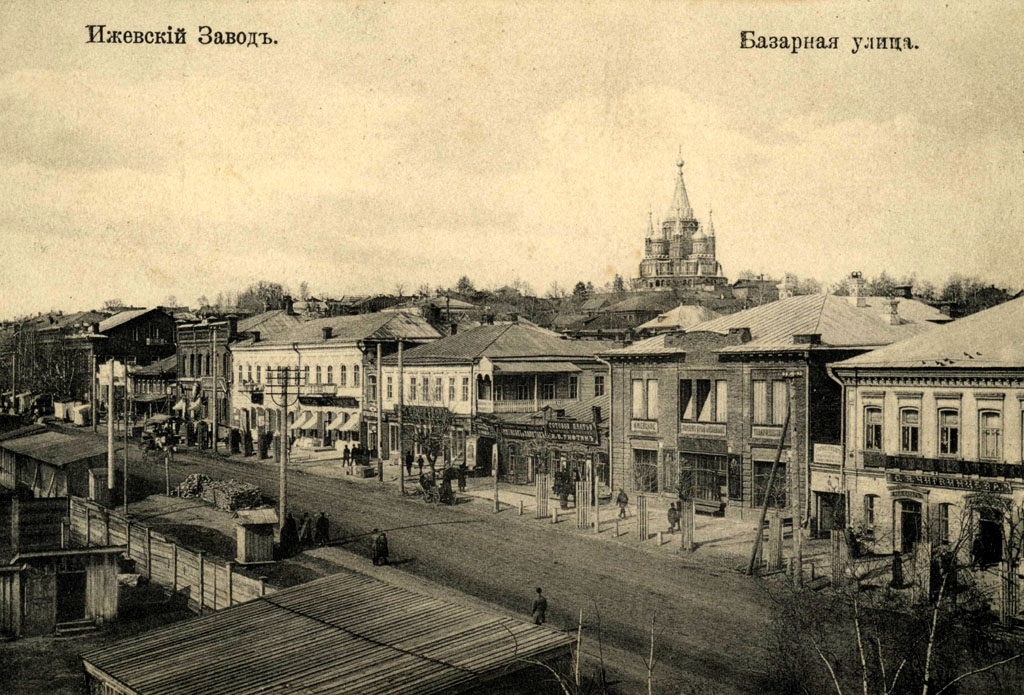
in 1918

=== Exterior ===
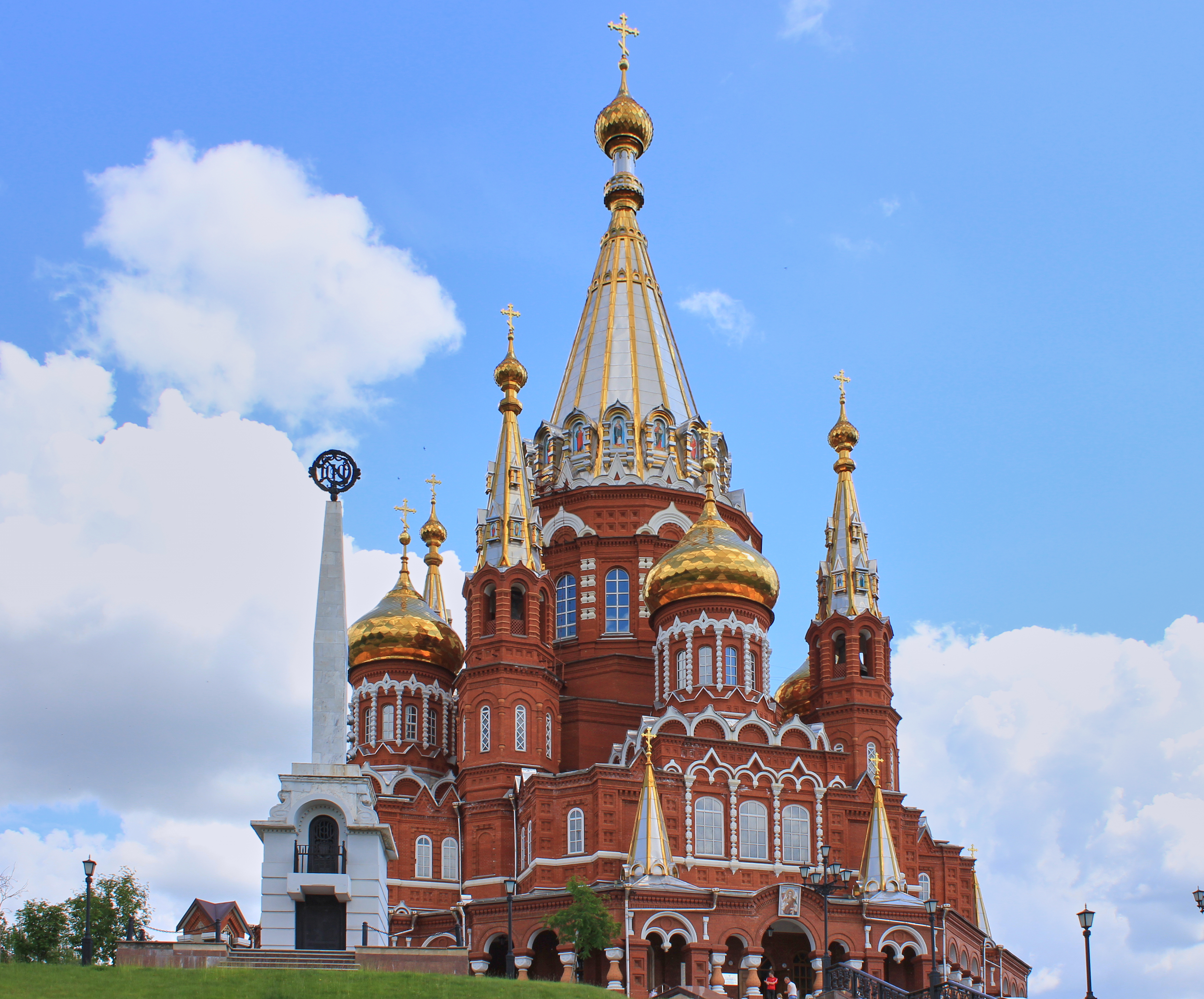

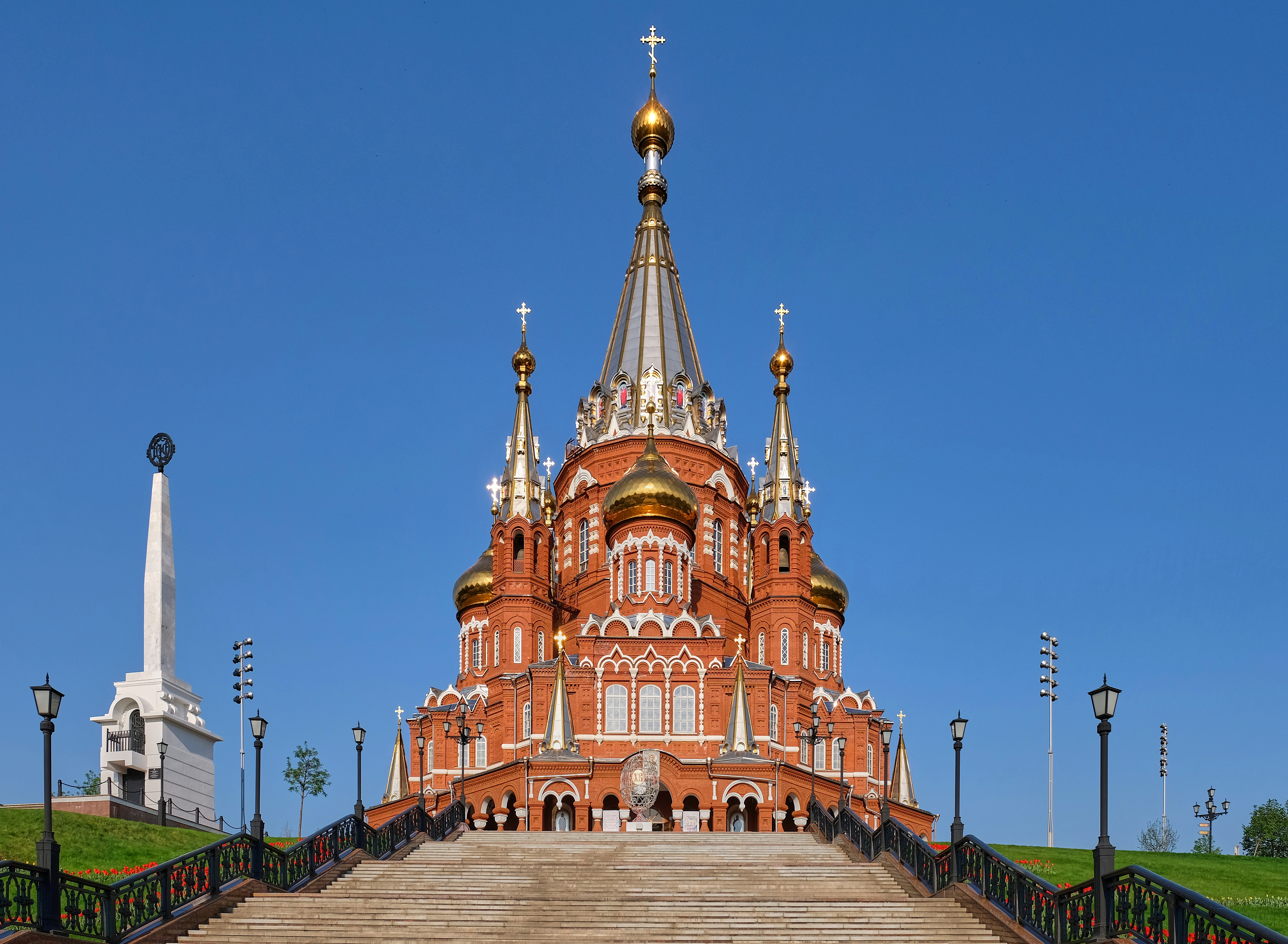

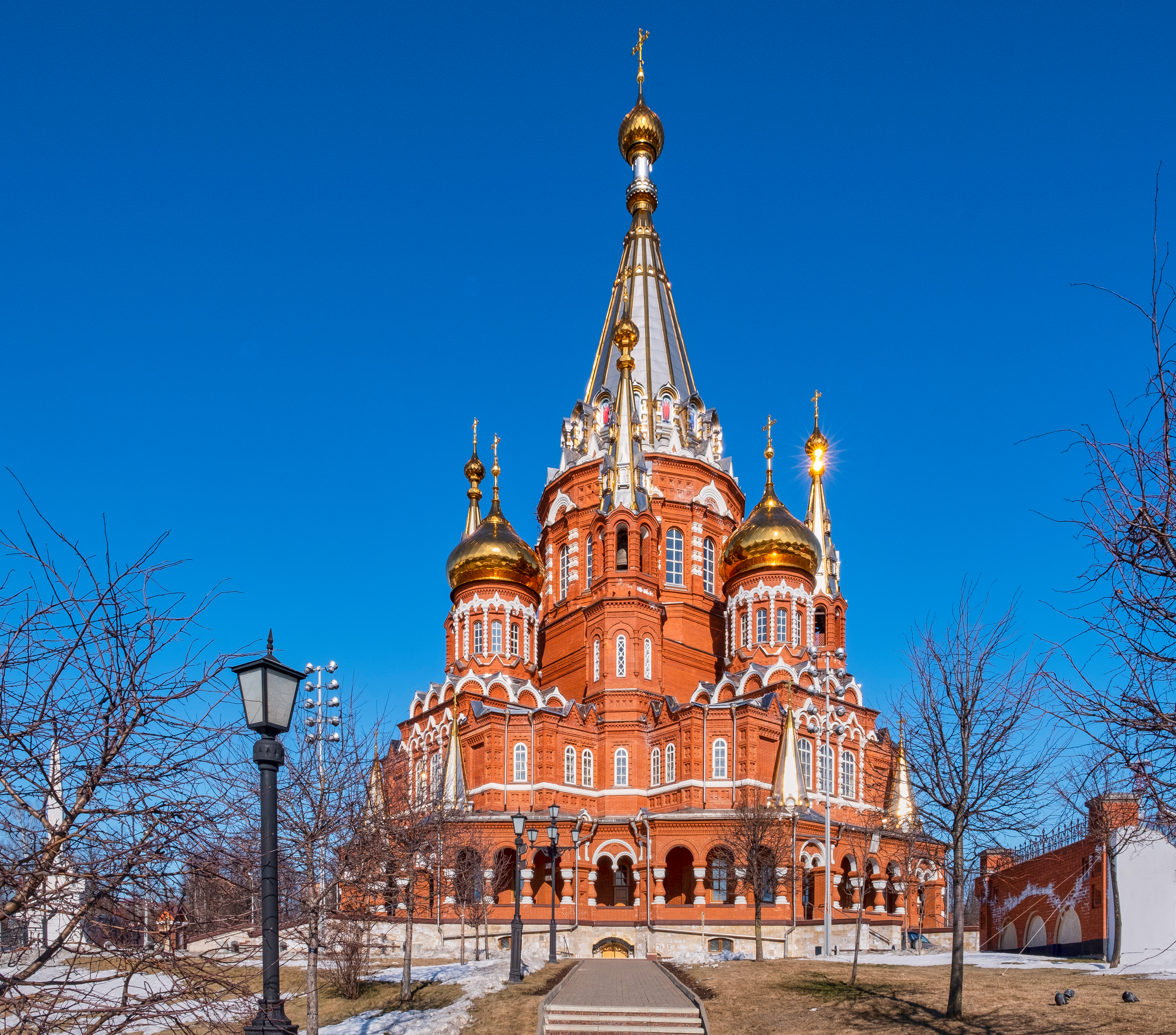

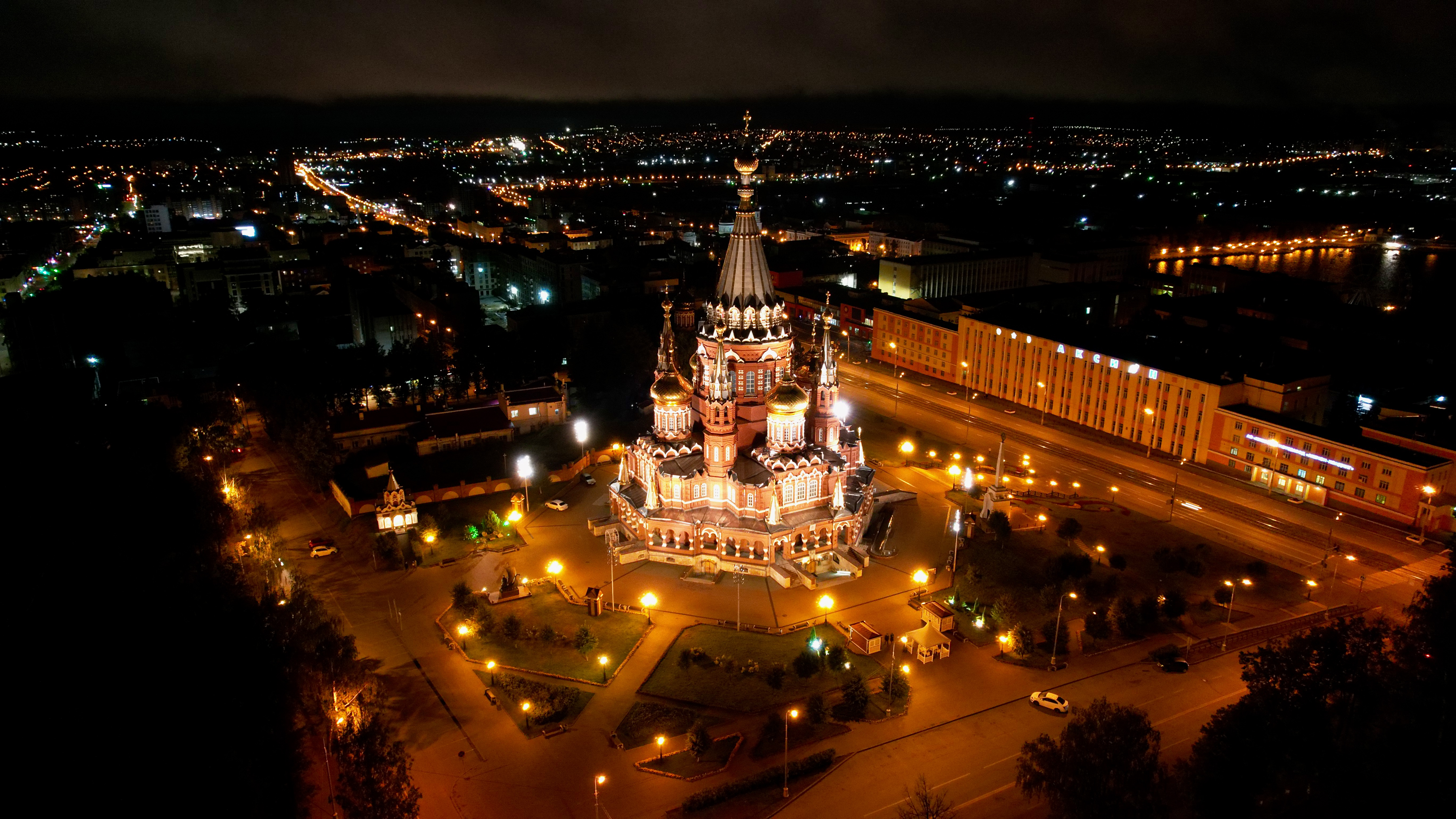

=== Interior ===
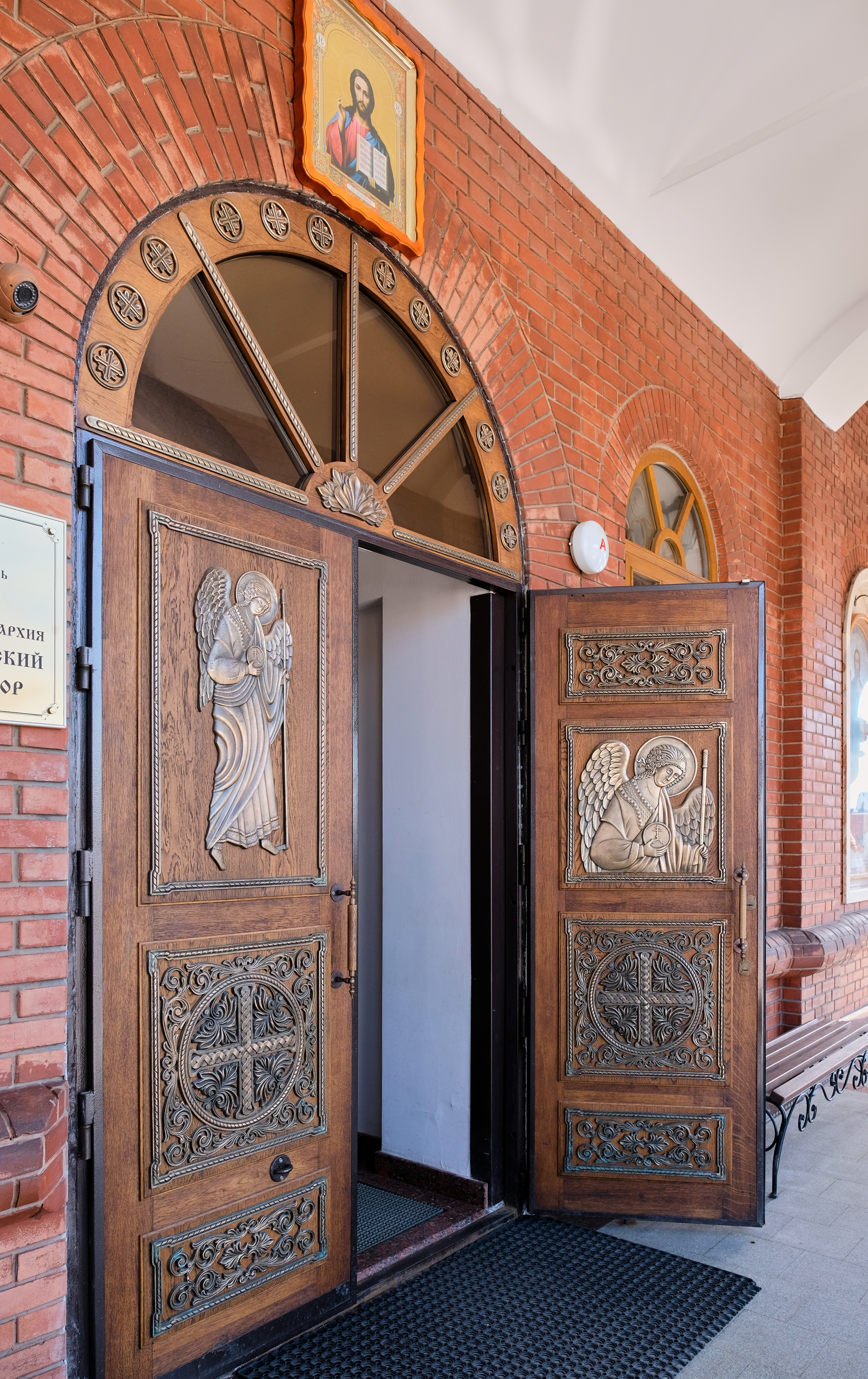

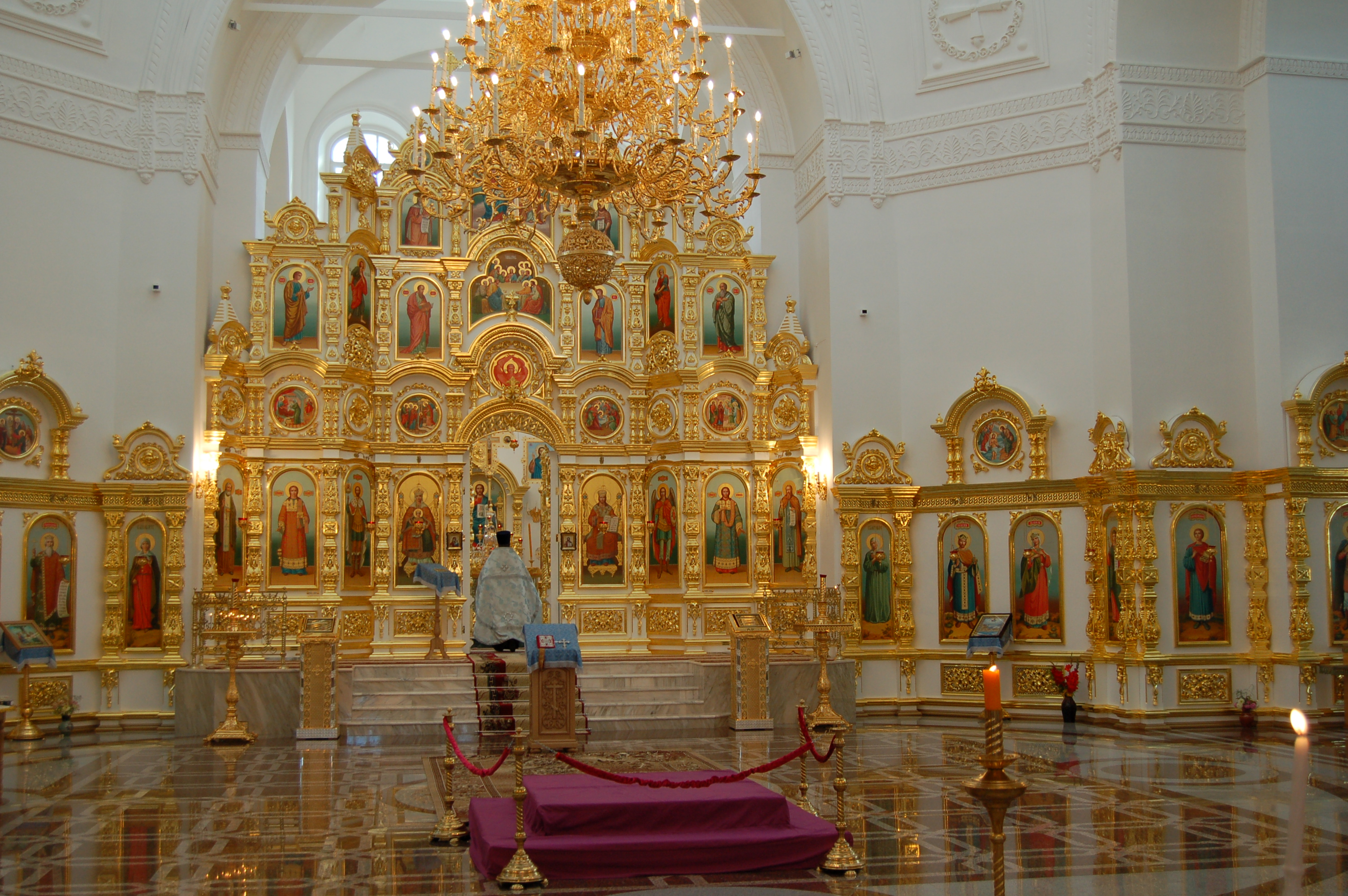

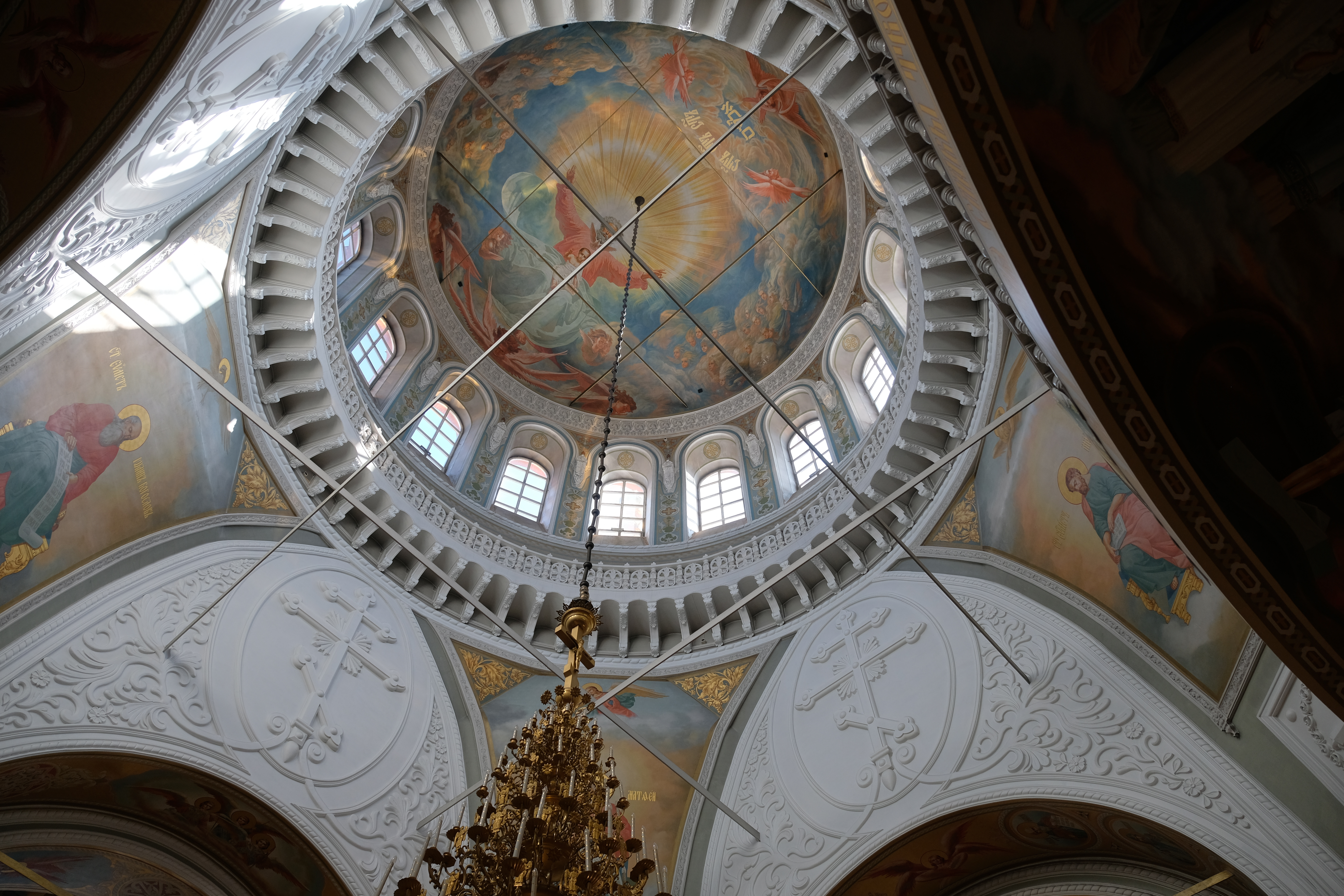
