= Sarapul =

City in the Udmurt Republic, Russia

Sarapul Сарапул
- City

Other transcription(s)
  - Udmurt: Сарапул
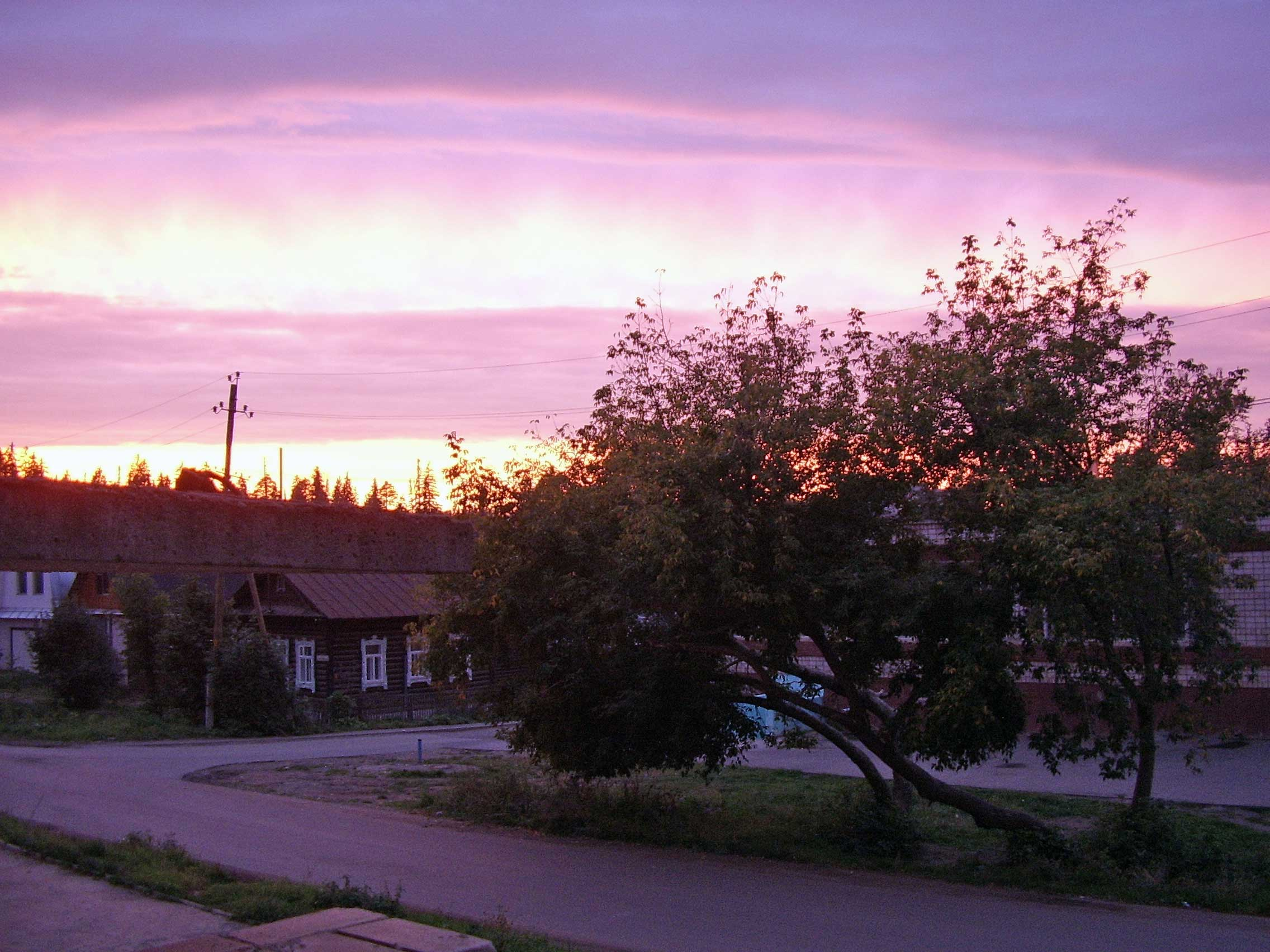
- Sedelnikova Street in Sarapul

- Flag Coat of arms
- Interactive map of Sarapul
- Location of Sarapul Sarapul (Udmurt Republic)
- Coordinates: 56°28′N 53°48′E
- Country: Russia
- Federal subject: Udmurtia
- First mentioned: 1596
- City status since: 1780
- Elevation: 80 m (260 ft)

Population (2010 Census)
  - Total: 101,381
  - Estimate (2025): 88,388 (−12.8%)
  - Rank: 161st in 2010

Administrative status
  - Subordinated to: city of republic significance of Sarapul
  - Capital of: city of republic significance of Sarapul

Municipal status
  - Urban okrug: Sarapul Urban Okrug
  - Capital of: Sarapul Urban Okrug
- Time zone: UTC+4 (MSK+1)
- Postal codes: 427960–427962, 427964–427968, 427970–427972, 427974, 427979
- Dialing code: +7 34147
- OKTMO ID: 94740000001

Sarapul (Udmurt and Russian: Сара́пул) is a city and a river port in the Udmurt Republic, Russia, located on the right bank of the Kama River, 66 kilometers (41 mi) southeast of Izhevsk, the capital of the republic. Population: 101,381 (2010 census); 103,141 (2002 census); 110,381 (1989 Soviet census).

== History ==
Sarapul is one of the oldest cities of the Kama region. It was first mentioned in a 1596 population audit book as the village (selo) of Voznesenskoye (Russian: Вознесе́нское, 'Ascension' [of Christ]), later known as Sarapul: "in Kazansky Uyezd in the upper Kama River ... in Sarapul and Siva people fish". Apparently, here Sarapul is the name of a section of the river, as well as the entire area along its shores. It is believed that the name of this area comes from the word сарапуль (sarapul) which in Chuvash means 'yellow fish', or sturgeon, which was in abundance here. Later, however, other versions of the origin of the name were considered. In particular, one of them says that the word sarapul formed by the merger of two words: sarah, which in one of the Siberian dialects means 'money', and pul, a small copper coin, thus meaning 'place of money'.

It was chartered in 1780 and by the end of the 18th century had grown into a merchant town with developed footwear manufacturing industry.

The city of Sarapul was one of the residence centers of the Udmurt Jews, who spoke Udmurtish Yiddish. In the lexicon of this dialect there was a noticeable number of Udmurt and Tatar loan words.

During the 2022 Russian invasion of Ukraine, Sarapul's Wildberries logistic hub was hit by Liutyi drones, as part of the a targeted campaign against Wildberries warehouses.

== Geography ==
=== Climate ===
Climate data for Sarapul (1991-2020, extremes 1923-present)
Month	Jan	Feb	Mar	Apr	May	Jun	Jul	Aug	Sep	Oct	Nov	Dec	Year
Record high °C (°F)	4.3 (39.7)	5.6 (42.1)	15.6 (60.1)	30.0 (86.0)	35.3 (95.5)	36.9 (98.4)	37.0 (98.6)	38.6 (101.5)	31.9 (89.4)	23.9 (75.0)	14.2 (57.6)	4.5 (40.1)	38.6 (101.5)
Mean daily maximum °C (°F)	−8.4 (16.9)	−7.2 (19.0)	−0.2 (31.6)	10.0 (50.0)	19.6 (67.3)	23.5 (74.3)	25.5 (77.9)	22.8 (73.0)	16.5 (61.7)	7.8 (46.0)	−1.3 (29.7)	−7.0 (19.4)	8.5 (47.2)
Daily mean °C (°F)	−11.8 (10.8)	−11.0 (12.2)	−4.3 (24.3)	4.7 (40.5)	13.0 (55.4)	17.4 (63.3)	19.6 (67.3)	17.0 (62.6)	11.2 (52.2)	4.2 (39.6)	−3.9 (25.0)	−9.9 (14.2)	3.9 (39.0)
Mean daily minimum °C (°F)	−15.2 (4.6)	−14.6 (5.7)	−8.0 (17.6)	0.4 (32.7)	7.4 (45.3)	12.0 (53.6)	14.3 (57.7)	12.3 (54.1)	7.3 (45.1)	1.4 (34.5)	−6.3 (20.7)	−12.9 (8.8)	−0.2 (31.7)
Record low °C (°F)	−47.4 (−53.3)	−42.7 (−44.9)	−30.9 (−23.6)	−21.4 (−6.5)	−11.3 (11.7)	−2.2 (28.0)	3.1 (37.6)	0.8 (33.4)	−4.6 (23.7)	−20.9 (−5.6)	−32.3 (−26.1)	−48.3 (−54.9)	−48.3 (−54.9)
Average precipitation mm (inches)	43 (1.7)	32 (1.3)	34 (1.3)	29 (1.1)	47 (1.9)	63 (2.5)	65 (2.6)	68 (2.7)	49 (1.9)	56 (2.2)	47 (1.9)	42 (1.7)	575 (22.8)
Average precipitation days	18.8	14.3	13.3	10.3	11.5	12.4	12.1	11.8	13.0	15.9	16.8	18.2	168.3
Mean monthly sunshine hours	47	92	155	221	285	308	316	254	154	79	44	36	1,991
Source 1: Pogoda.ru.net
Source 2: climatebase.ru (precipitation days, sun 1923-2012)

== Administrative and municipal status ==
Within the framework of administrative divisions, it is incorporated as the city of republic significance of Sarapul—an administrative unit with the status equal to that of the districts. As a municipal division, the city of republic significance of Sarapul is incorporated as Sarapul Urban Okrug.

== Economy ==
Currently, Sarapul is the second most important industrial town in the republic after Izhevsk.

== Honors ==
The asteroid 26851 Sarapul was named by astronomer Eric Elst in the city's honor on June 1, 2007.

== Notable people ==
- Ruslan Avleev, basketball player
- Zulya Kamalova, singer
- Yevgeny Kychanov, historian
- Peter Palchinsky, engineer
- Vladimir Sarayev, football player
- Oleg Zhakov, actor
