= Adamka =

- Village
- Location within Poland
- Coordinates: 51°45′57″N 18°50′1″E
- Country: Poland
- Voivodeship: Łódź
- County: Poddębice
- Gmina: Zadzim
- Population: 46

Adamka [aˈdamka] is a village in the administrative district of Gmina Zadzim, within Poddębice County, Łódź Voivodeship, in central Poland.
