= Mordkhe Veynger =

Russian and Soviet linguist

Mordkhe Veynger (Russian: Мордхе Вейнгер; 1890–February 4, 1929), more infrequently known as Mikhail Borisovich Veynger (Russian: Михаил Борисович Вейнгер), was a Russian and Soviet linguist. An ethnic Jew, he specialised in the study of the Yiddish language.

Born in Poltava, Russian Empire (now in Ukraine), his family moved to Warsaw when he was a child, where he studied Germanic philology at the Imperial University of Warsaw. After World War I he established himself at Minsk where he became lecturer at the Belarusian State University.

He began the first Yiddish dialect atlas, Yidisher shprakhatlas fun Sovetn-farband (Yiddish Language Atlas of the Soviet Union), in the 1920s. The atlas is limited to phonology and to Yiddish spoken within the contemporary territory of the early Soviet Union (before 1930). The latter is seen as a major drawback, because it did not include populous Mideastern (“Polish”) Yiddish.

Veynger committed suicide on February 4, 1929, allegedly over a failed love affair.
