= Alnashi =

Village in Alnashsky District, Udmurt Republic, Russia

Coordinates: 56°11′N 52°29′E

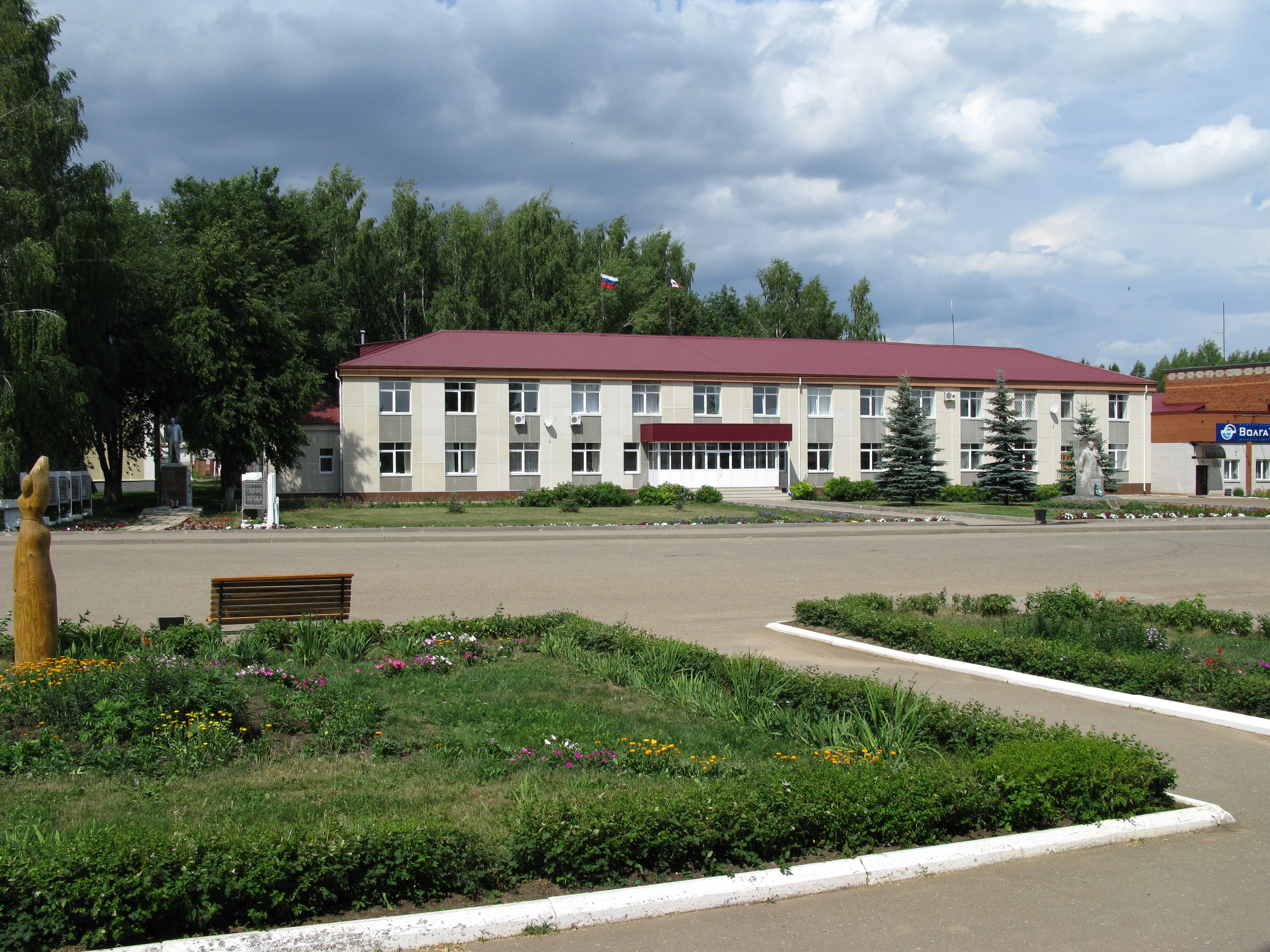
Alnashi centre

Alnashi (Russian: Алнаши, Udmurt: Алнаш, Alnaš) is a selo (larger village) in Alnashsky District, Udmurt Republic, Russia. It is located by the confluence of rivers Toyma and Alnashka.

Its recorded history traces back to 1716. It was officially recognized as selo in 1836.

== Notable people ==
- Alexander Solovyov (politician), head of Udmurtia (2014–2017) was born here
