= Udmurt language =

Uralic language

Udmurt
- Votyak
- удмурт кыл udmurt kyl
- Native to: Russia
- Region: Udmurtia
- Ethnicity: Udmurts, Besermyans
- Native speakers: 270,000 (2020 census)
- Language family: Uralic: Permic; Udmurt
- Dialects: Northern; Central; Southern; Besermyan
- Writing system: Cyrillic

Official status
- Official language in: Russia: Udmurtia

Language codes
- ISO 639-2: udm
- ISO 639-3: udm
- Glottolog: udmu1245
- ELP: Udmurt
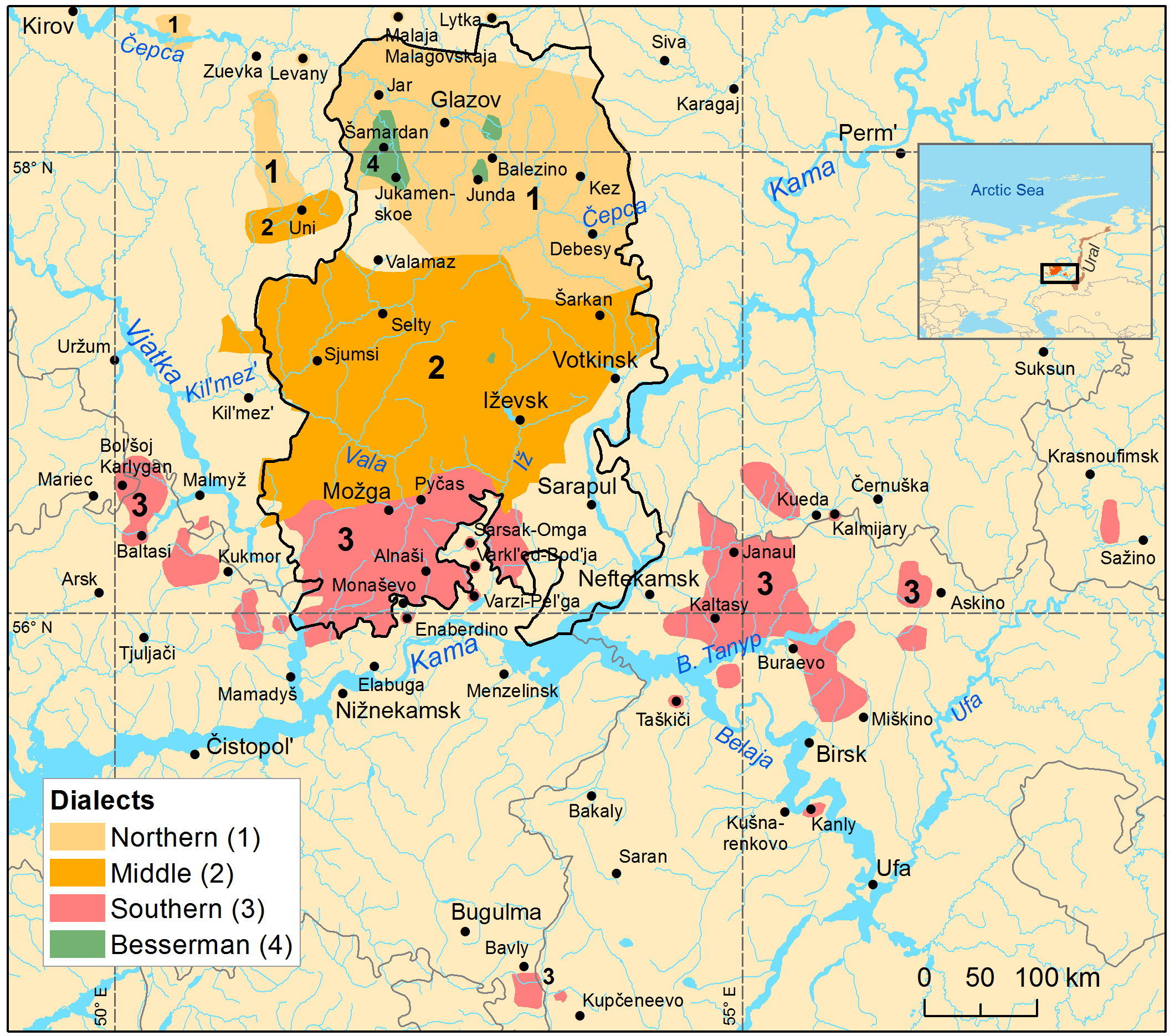
- Distribution of Udmurt dialects at the beginning of 21st century

- Udmurt is classified as Definitely Endangered by the UNESCO Atlas of the World's Languages in Danger.

Udmurt (/ʊdˈmʊərt/; Cyrillic: удмурт), also sometimes referred to as Udmurtian or Votyak, is a Permic language spoken by the Udmurt people who are native to Udmurtia. As a Uralic language, it is distantly related to languages such as Finnish, Estonian, Mansi, Khanty, and Hungarian. The Udmurt language is co-official with Russian within Udmurtia.

It is written using the Cyrillic alphabet with the addition of five characters not used in the Russian alphabet: Ӝ/ӝ, Ӟ/ӟ, Ӥ/ӥ, Ӧ/ӧ, and Ӵ/ӵ. Together with the Komi and Permyak languages, it constitutes the Permic grouping of the Uralic family. The Udmurt language shares similar agglutinative structures with its closest relative, the Komi language. Among outsiders, it has traditionally been referred to by its Russian exonym, Votyak. Udmurt has borrowed vocabulary from neighboring languages, mainly from Tatar and Russian.

In 2010, per the Russian census, there were around 324,000 speakers of the language in the country, out of the ethnic population of roughly 554,000. Ethnologue estimated that there were 550,000 native speakers (77%) out of an ethnic population of 750,000 in the former Russian SFSR (1989 census), a decline of roughly 41% in 21 years.

== Dialects ==
Udmurt varieties can be grouped into three broad dialect groups:

- Northern Udmurt, spoken along the Cheptsa River
- Southern Udmurt
- Besermyan, spoken by the strongly Turkified Besermyans

A continuum of intermediate dialects between Northern and Southern Udmurt is found, and literary Udmurt includes features from both areas. Besermyan is more sharply distinguished.

The differences between the dialects are not major and mainly involve differences in vocabulary, largely attributable to the stronger influence of Tatar in the southern end of the Udmurt-speaking area. A few differences in morphology and phonology still exist as well; for example:

- Southern Udmurt has an accusative ending -ыз /-ɨz/, contrasting with northern -ты /-tɨ/.
- Southwestern Udmurt distinguishes an eighth vowel phoneme /ʉ/.
- Besermyan has /e/ in place of standard Udmurt /ə/ (thus distinguishing only six vowel phonemes), and /ɵ/ in place of standard Udmurt /ɨ/.

== Phonology ==
Unlike other Uralic languages such as Finnish and Hungarian, Udmurt does not distinguish between long and short vowels and does not have vowel harmony.

=== Consonants ===
| | | Labial | Alveolar | Post- alveolar | (Alveolo-) palatal | Velar |
|---|---|---|---|---|---|---|
| Nasal | | m | n | | ɲ | ŋ |
| Plosive | voiceless | p | t | | tʲ | k |
| Plosive | voiced | b | d | | dʲ | ɡ |
| Affricate | voiceless | | (t͡s) | t͡ʃ | t͡ɕ | |
| Affricate | voiced | | (d͡z) | d͡ʒ | d͡ʑ | |
| Fricative | voiceless | (f) | s | ʃ | ɕ | (x) |
| Fricative | voiced | v | z | ʒ | ʑ | |
| Approximant | median | | | | j | |
| Approximant | lateral | | l | | ʎ | |
| Trill | | | r | | | |

The consonants /f x t͡s/ are restricted to loanwords, and are traditionally replaced by /p k t͡ɕ/ respectively. As in Hungarian, Udmurt exhibits regressive voicing and devoicing assimilations (the last element determines the assimilation), but with some exceptions (mostly to distinguish minimal pairs by voicing).

=== Vowels ===
| | Front | Central | Back |
|---|---|---|---|
| Close | i | ɨ | u |
| Mid | e | ə | o |
| Open | | a | |

== Orthography ==
Udmurt is written using a modified version of the Russian Cyrillic alphabet:

| Cyrillic | Latin | IPA | Letter name | Notes |
|---|---|---|---|---|
| А а | A a | [a] | а | |
| Б б | B b | [b] | бэ | |
| В в | V v | [v] | вэ | |
| Г г | G g | [ɡ] | гэ | |
| Д д | D d Ď ď | [d] [dʲ~ɟ] before е, ё, и, ю, я, ь | дэ | |
| Е е | JE je E e | [je] [ʲe] after coronals д, т, з, с, л, н | е | |
| Ё ё | JO jo O o | [jo] [ʲo] after д, т, з, с, л, н | ё | |
| Ж ж | Ž ž | [ʒ] | жэ | |
| Ӝ ӝ | DŽ dž | [d͡ʒ] | ӝэ | Д + Ж |
| З з | Z z Ź ź | [z] [ʑ] before е, ё, и, ю, я, ь | зэ | |
| Ӟ ӟ | DŹ dź | [d͡ʑ] | ӟе | Дь + Зь |
| И и | I i | [i] [ʲi] after д, т, з, с, л, н | и | |
| Ӥ ӥ | I i | [i] when preceded by д, т, з, с, л, н | точкаен и, точкаосын и ("dotted i") | Like Komi і. Non-palatalizing form of и. |
| Й й | J j | [j] | вакчи и ("short i") | |
| К к | K k | [k] | ка | |
| Л л | Ł ł L l | [ɫ] [ʎ] before е, ё, и, ю, я, ь | эл | |
| М м | M m | [m] | эм | |
| Н н | N n Ň ň | [n] [ɲ] before е, ё, и, ю, я, ь | эн | |
| О о | O o | [o] | о | |
| Ӧ ӧ | Õ õ | [ɜ]~[ə] | ӧ | |
| П п | P p | [p] | пэ | |
| Р р | R r | [r] | эр | |
| С с | S s Ś ś | [s] [ɕ] before е, ё, и, ю, я, ь | эс | |
| Т т | T t Ť ť | [t] [tʲ~c] before е, ё, и, ю, я, ь | тэ | |
| У у | U u | [u] | у | |
| Ф ф | F f | [f] | эф | In loanwords. |
| Х х | H h | [x] | ха | In loanwords. |
| Ц ц | C c | [t͡s] | цэ | In loanwords. |
| Ч ч | Ć ć | [t͡ɕ] | чэ | Ть + Сь |
| Ӵ ӵ | Č č | [t͡ʃ] | ӵэ | Т + Ш |
| Ш ш | Š š | [ʃ] | ша | |
| Щ щ | ŠČ šč | [ɕ(ː)] | ща | In loanwords. |
| Ъ ъ | – | – | чурыт пус ("hard sign") | Distinguishes palatalized consonants (/dʲ/ /tʲ/ /zʲ/ /sʲ/ /lʲ/ /n/) from unpalatalized consonants followed by /j/ if followed by vowel; for example, /zʲo/ and /zjo/ are written зё (źo) and зъё (zjo), respectively. |
| Ы ы | Y y | [ɨ]~[ɯ] | ы | |
| Ь ь | – | [ʲ] | небыт пус ("soft sign") | |
| Э э | E e | [e] | э | |
| Ю ю | JU ju | [ju] [ʲu] after д, т, з, с, л, н | ю | |
| Я я | JA ja | [ja] [ʲa] after д, т, з, с, л, н | я | |

== Grammar ==
Udmurt is an agglutinating language. It uses affixes to express possession, to specify mode, time, and so on.

No gender distinction is made in nouns or personal pronouns.

=== Cases ===
Udmurt has fifteen cases: eight grammatical cases and seven locative cases.

There is no congruency between adjectives and nouns in neutral Udmurt noun phrases; in other words, there is no adjective declension as in the inessive noun phrase бадӟым гуртын ("in a big village"; cf. Finnish inessive phrase isossa kylässä, in which iso "large" is inflected according to the head noun).

Udmurt cases
| Case | Suffix | Example | Translation |
Grammatical
| nominative | – | гурт /gurt/ | village |
| genitive | -лэн /ɫen/ | гуртлэн /gurtɫen/ | of a village / village's |
| accusative | -эз/-ез/-ты/-ыз /ez/jez/tɨ/ɨz/ | гуртэз /gurtez/ | village (as an object) |
| ablative | -лэсь /ɫeɕ/ | гуртлэсь /gurtɫeɕ/ | from a village |
| dative | -лы /ɫɨ/ | гуртлы /gurtɫɨ/ | to a village |
| instrumental | -эн/-ен/-ын /en/jen/ɨn/ | гуртэн /gurten/ | by means of a village |
| abessive | -тэк /tek/ | гурттэк /gurtːek/ | without a village |
| adverbial | -я /jɑ/ | гуртъя /gurtjɑ/ | in a village way |
Locative cases*
| inessive | -ын /ɨn/ | гуртын /gurtɨn/ | in a village |
| illative | -э/-е/-ы /e/je/ɨ/ | гуртэ /gurte/ | into a village (or house) |
| elative | -ысь /ɨɕ/ | гуртысь /gurtɨɕ/ | from a village |
| egressive | -ысен /ɨɕen/ | гуртысен /gurtɨɕen/ | starting from a village |
| terminative | -озь /oʑ/ | гуртозь /gurtoʑ/ | end up at a village |
| prolative | -этӥ/-етӥ/-ытӥ/-тӥ /eti/jeti/ɨti/ti/ | гуртэтӥ /gurteti/ | along a village |
| allative | -лань /ɫɑɲ/ | гуртлань /gurtɫɑɲ/ | towards a village |

*Of all the locative cases, personal pronouns can only inflect in the allative (also called approximative).

=== Plural ===
There are two types of nominal plurals in Udmurt. One is the plural for nouns -ос/-ëс and the other is the plural for adjectives -эсь/-есь.

==== Nominal plural ====
The noun is always in plural. In attributive plural phrases, the adjective is not required to be in the plural:

Attributive plural
| Udmurt | Transliteration | English |
|---|---|---|
| чебер(есь) нылъёс | ćeber(eś) nyljos | (the) beautiful girls |

The plural marker always comes before other endings (i.e. cases and possessive suffixes) in the morphological structure of plural nominal.

Morphological order
| Udmurt | Transliteration | English |
|---|---|---|
| нылъёслы | nyljosly | to the girls |
| гуртъёсазы | gurtjosazy | to/in their villages |

==== Predicative plural ====
As in Hungarian and Mordvinic languages, if the subject is plural, the adjective is always plural when it functions as the sentence's predicative:

Attributive plural
| Udmurt | Transliteration | English |
|---|---|---|
| нылъёс чебересь | nyljos ćebereś | the girls are beautiful |
| толъёс кузесь | toljos kuźeś | the winters are long |

Udmurt pronouns are inflected much in the same way that their referent nouns are. However, personal pronouns are only inflected in the grammatical cases and cannot be inflected in the locative cases.

=== Pronouns ===
==== Personal pronouns ====
Udmurt personal pronouns are used to refer to human beings only. However, the third person singular can be referred to as it. The nominative case of personal pronouns are listed in the following table:

Personal pronouns
| | singular | plural |
|---|---|---|
| 1st person | мон /mon/ | ми /mi/ |
| 2nd person | тон /ton/ | тӥ /ti/ |
| 3rd person | со /so/ | соос /soːs/ |

More details:

- There are self-intensifier forms: ачим '[I] myself', ачид '[you] yourself', ачиз '[he/she/it] himself', асьмеос '[we] ourselves', асьтэос '[you] yourself', асьсэос '[they] yourself'.
- The 1st person plural has two forms according to clusivity: асьмеос is "inclusive we" and "ми" is "exclusive we". The younger speakers seem to favor always using "ми" (probably under the influence of Russian 'my' for "we"), so that for older generation the verse from a popular song "Ойдо, нылаш ми тонэн пумиськом!" sounds strange: its intended meaning is "Hey girl, let us meet!", while in the traditional thinking it reads "Hey girl, let we all meet with you!" The expected proper phrase would be: "Ойдо, нылаш асьмеос пумиськом!" and 'ми тонэн' is a calque from the Russian phrase 'my s toboi' meaning "me and you", but the word-by-word translation is "we with you".

==== Interrogative pronouns ====
Udmurt interrogative pronouns inflect in all cases. However, the inanimate interrogative pronouns 'what' in the locative cases have the base form кыт-. The nominative case of interrogative pronouns are listed in the following table:

Interrogative pronouns (nominative case)
| Udmurt | English |
Singular
| ма /mɑ/ | what |
| кин /kin/ | who |
Plural
| маос /mɑos/ | what |
| кинъëс /kinjos/ | who |

=== Verbs ===
Udmurt verbs are divided into two conjugation groups, both having the infinitive marker -ны.

There are three verbal moods in Udmurt: indicative, conditional and imperative. There is also an optative mood used in certain dialects. The indicative mood has four tenses: present, future, and two past tenses. In addition there are four past tense structures which include auxiliary verbs. Verbs are negated by use of an auxiliary negative verb that conjugates with personal endings.

The basic verbal personal markers in Udmurt are (with some exceptions):

Personal endings of verbs
| Person | Ending |
Singular
| 1st | -Ø |
| 2nd | -д |
| 3rd | -з |
Plural
| 1st | -мы |
| 2nd | -ды |
| 3rd | -зы |

Example conjugation: тодыны (conjugation I)
| Person | Udmurt | Transliteration | English |
Singular
| 1st | тодӥсько* | todiśko* | I know |
| 2nd | тодӥськод* | todiśkod* | you know |
| 3rd | тодэ | tode | he/she knows |
Plural
| 1st | тодӥськомы | todiśkomy | we know |
| 2nd | тодӥськоды | todiśkody | you know |
| 3rd | тодо | todo | they know |

*The present tense in Udmurt in all but the third person, is marked with -(ӥ)сько-/-(и)сько-.

=== Syntax ===
Udmurt is an SOV language.

== Lexicon ==
Depending on the style, about 10 to 30 percent of the Udmurt lexicon consists of loanwords. Many loanwords are from the Tatar language, which has also strongly influenced Udmurt phonology and syntax.

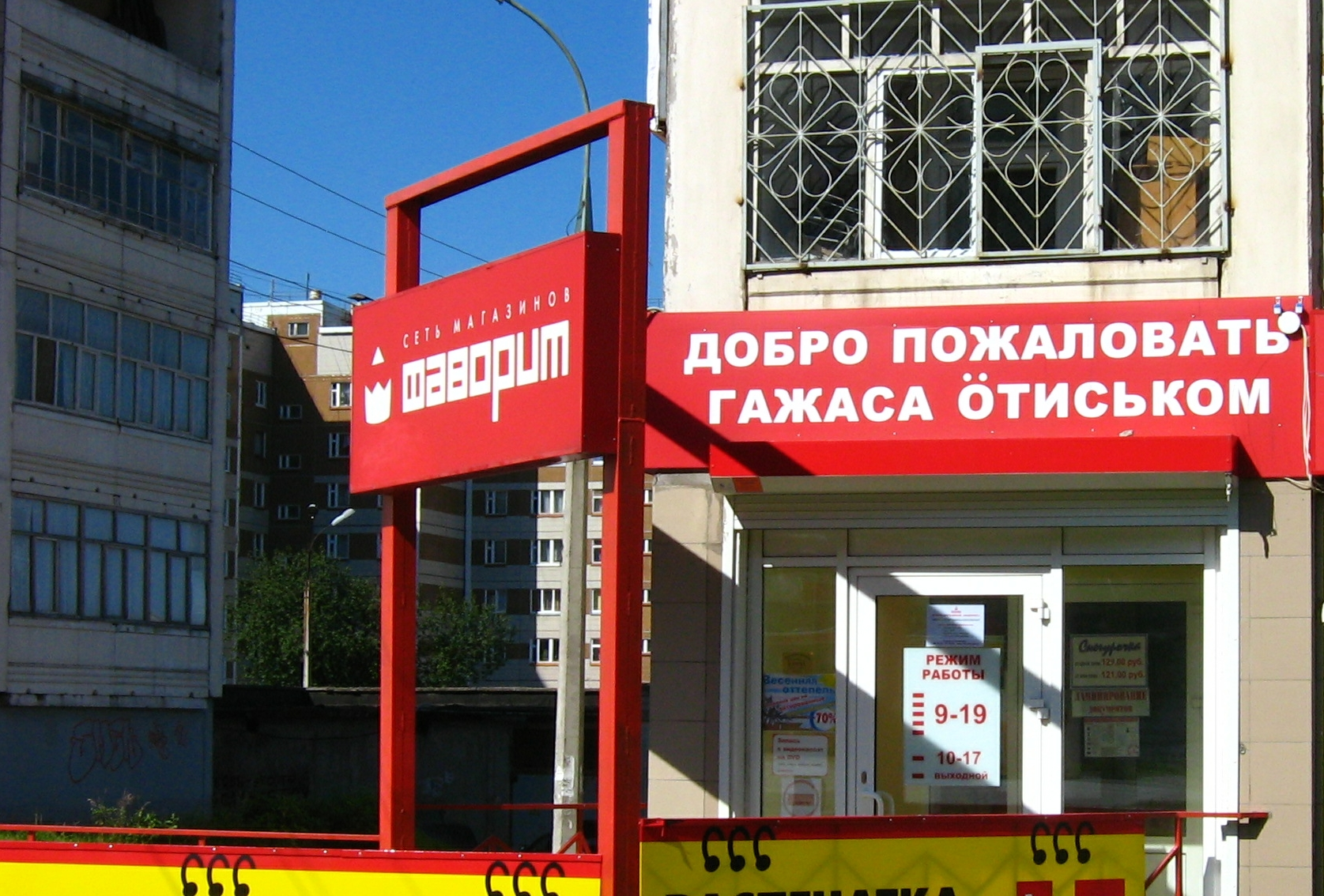
A bilingual sign in Izhevsk proclaiming "welcome" in Russian ("добро пожаловать") and Udmurt ("гажаса ӧтиськом")

The Udmurt language, along with the Tatar language, influenced the language of the Udmurt Jews, in the dialects of which the words of Finno-Ugric and Turkic origin there were recorded.

== Media ==
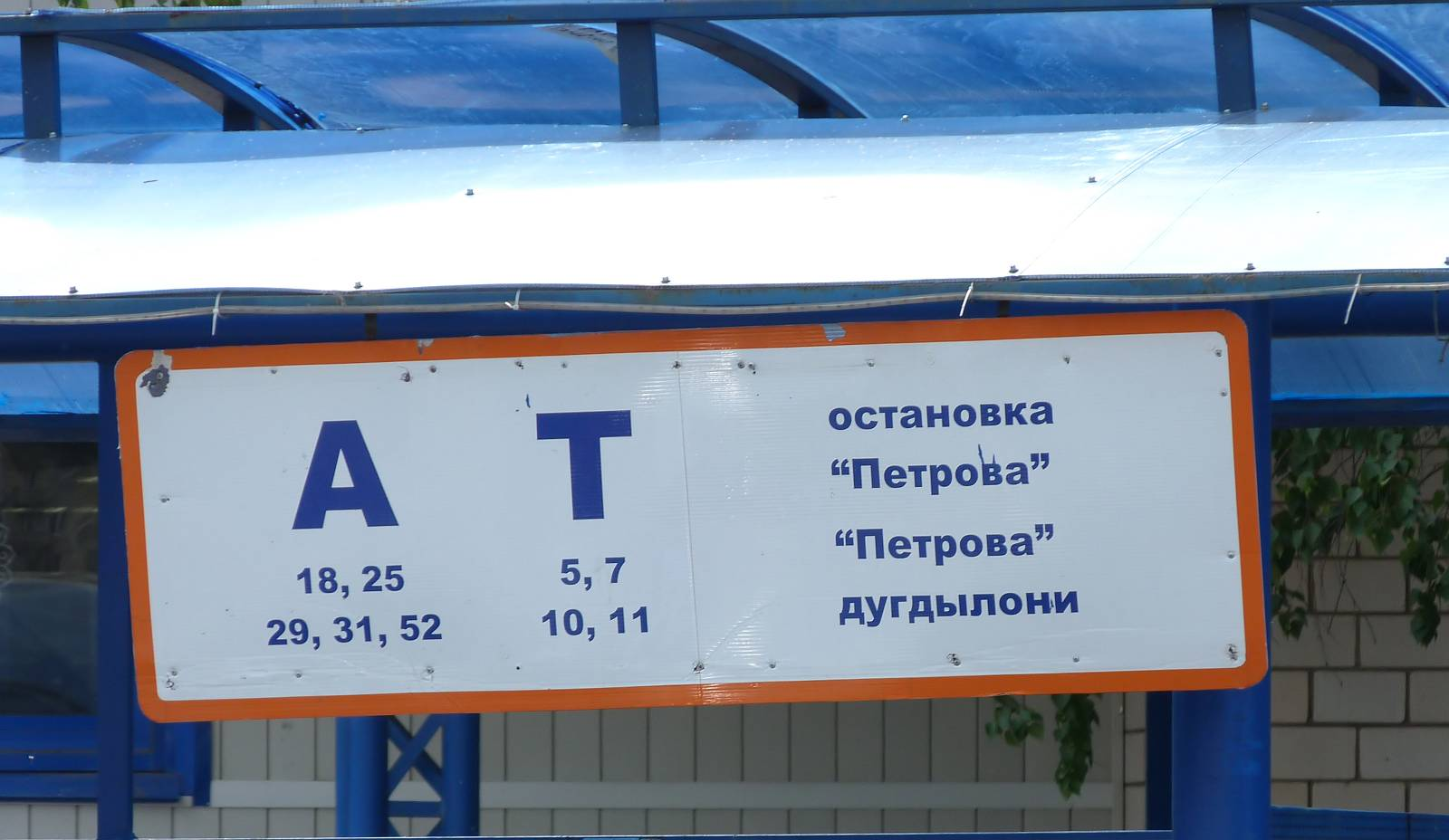
Bus and trolleybus stop tag in Russian and Udmurt languages in Izhevsk

Eurovision runners-up Buranovskiye Babushki, a pop group composed of Udmurt grandmothers, sing mostly in Udmurt.

The romantic comedy film Berry-Strawberry, a joint Polish-Udmurt production, is in the Udmurt language.

In 2013, the film company "Inwis kinopottonni" produced a film in the Udmurt language called Puzkar ("nest").

The Bible was first completely translated into Udmurt in 2013.

== Bibliography ==
- Csúcs, Sándor (1998). "Udmurt". In Abondolo, Daniel (ed.). The Uralic Languages. London: Routledge. pp. 276–304.
- Kel'makov, Valentin; Sara Hännikäinen (2008). Udmurtin kielioppia ja harjoituksia (in Finnish) (2nd ed.). Helsinki: Suomalais-Ugrilainen Seura. ISBN 978-952-5150-34-6.
- Moreau, Jean-Luc (2009). Parlons Oudmourte. Paris: L'Harmattan. ISBN 978-2-296-07951-9.
- Svetlana Edygarova (2014). "The varieties of the modern Udmurt language". Finnisch-Ugrische Forschungen (62): 376–398. doi:10.33339/fuf.86085. Wikidata Q122984591.
