= List of rural localities in Udmurtia =

Map of Russia with Udmurtia highlighted

This is a list of rural localities in Udmurtia. Udmurtia (Russian: Удму́ртия, romanized: Udmurtiya, IPA: [ʊˈdmurtʲɪjə]; Udmurt: Удмуртия), or the Udmurt Republic, is a federal subject of Russia (a republic) within the Volga Federal District. Its capital is the city of Izhevsk. Population: 1,521,420 (2010 Census).

== Alnashsky District ==
Rural localities in Alnashsky District:

- Abyshevo
- Alnashi

== Balezinsky District ==
Rural localities in Balezinsky District:

- 1214 km
- Balezino

== Debyossky District ==
Rural localities in Debyossky District:

- Debyosy

== Grakhovsky District ==
Rural localities in Grakhovsky District:

- Grakhovo

== Igrinsky District ==
Rural localities in Igrinsky District:

- Igra

== Karakulinsky District ==
Rural localities in Karakulinsky District:

- Karakulino

== Kezsky District ==
Rural localities in Kezsky District:

- Kez

== Kiyasovsky District ==
Rural localities in Kiyasovsky District:

- Kiyasovo

== Kiznersky District ==
Rural localities in Kiznersky District:

- Kizner

== Krasnogorsky District ==
Rural localities in Krasnogorsky District:

- Krasnogorskoye

== Malopurginsky District ==
Rural localities in Malopurginsky District:

- Buranovo
- Malaya Purga

== Sarapulsky District ==
Rural localities in Sarapulsky District:

- Sigayevo

== Seltinsky District ==
Rural localities in Seltinsky District:

- Selty

== Sharkansky District ==
Rural localities in Sharkansky District:

- Sharkan

== Syumsinsky District ==
Rural localities in Syumsinsky District:

- Syumsi

== Uvinsky District ==
Rural localities in Uvinsky District:

- Uva

== Vavozhsky District ==
Rural localities in Vavozhsky District:

- Vavozh

== Yakshur-Bodyinsky District ==
Rural localities in Yakshur-Bodyinsky District:

- Chur
- Yakshur-Bodya

== Yukamensky District ==
Rural localities in Yukamensky District:

- Yukamenskoye

== Zavyalovsky District ==
Rural localities in Zavyalovsky District:

- Senteg
- Zavyalovo

== See also ==
- Lists of rural localities in Russia
