= Udmurtia constituency =

Russian legislative constituency

Udmurtia single-member constituency
- Constituency of the Russian State Duma

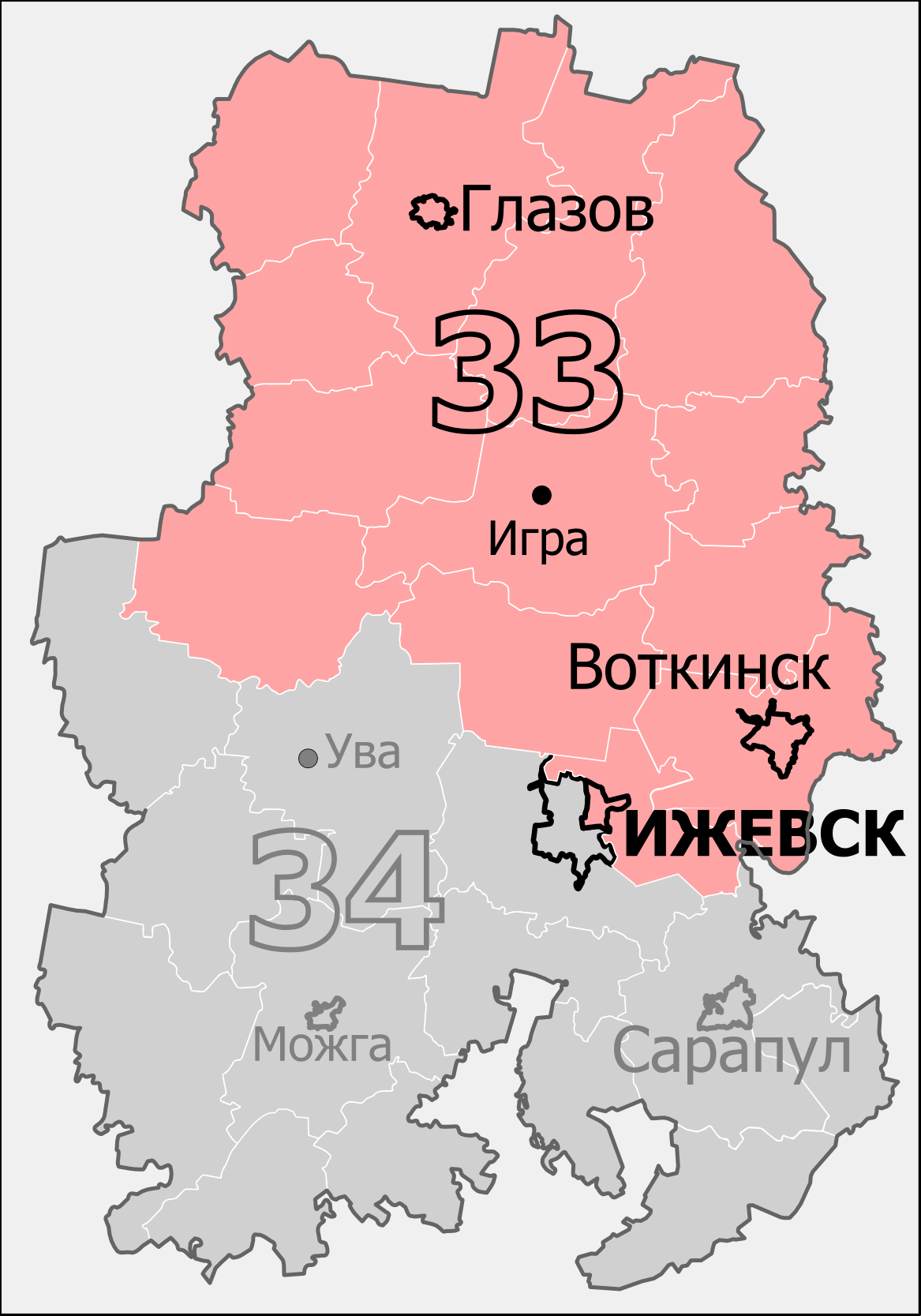
- Constituency boundaries since 2016
- Deputy: Andrey Isayev; United Russia
- Federal subject: Udmurt Republic
- Districts: Balezinsky, Debyossky, Glazov, Glazovsky, Igrinsky, Izhevsk (Industrialny, Ustinovsky), Kezsky, Krasnogorsky, Seltinsky, Sharkansky, Votkinsk, Votkinsky, Yakshur-Bodyinsky, Yarsky, Yukamensky, Zavyalovsky (Golyanskoye, Italmasovkoye, Kazmasskoye, Khokhryakovskoye, Oktyanrskoye, Pervomayskoye, Yagulskoye, Yakshurskoye, Zavyalovskoye)
- Voters: 552,994 (2026)

The Udmurtia constituency (No.38 (Note: No.30 in 1993-1995 and 2003-2007, No.29 in 1995-2003, No.33 in 2016–2026)) is a Russian legislative constituency in Udmurtia. The constituency covers north-western Izhevsk and northern Udmurtia.

The constituency has been represented since 2021 by United Russia deputy Andrey Isayev, a seven-term State Duma member and former Deputy Chairman of the Duma, who won the open seat, succeeding one-term United Russia incumbent Aleksey Zagrebin.

== Boundaries ==
1993–2007: Alnashsky District, Balezinsky District, Debyossky, Glazov, Glazovsky District, Grakhovsky District, Igrinsky District, Kambarsky District, Karakulinsky District, Kezsky District, Kiyasovsky District, Kiznersky District, Krasnogorsky District, Malopurginsky District, Mozhga, Mozhginsky District, Sarapul, Sarapulsky District, Seltinsky District, Sharkansky District, Syumsinsky District, Uvinsky District, Vavozhsky District, Yakshur-Bodyinsky District, Yarsky District, Yukamensky District
The constituency covered most of Udmurtia, encompassing the entire republic, except for Izhevsk, Votkinsk and their suburbs and exurbs.

2016–present: Balezinsky District, Debyossky District, Glazov, Glazovsky District, Igrinsky District, Izhevsk (Industrialny, Ustinovsky), Kezsky District, Krasnogorsky District, Seltinsky District, Sharkansky District, Votkinsk, Votkinsky District, Yakshur-Bodyinsky District, Yarsky District, Yukamensky District, Zavyalovsky District (Golyanskoye, Italmasovkoye, Kazmasskoye, Khokhryakovskoye, Oktyabrskoye, Pervomayskoye, Yagulskoye, Yakshurskoye, Zavyalovo)
The constituency was re-created for the 2016 election. This seat retained only northern Udmurtia, losing its southern half to Izhevsk constituency. The constituency gained Votkinsk and parts of Izhevsk from Izhevsk constituency.

== Members elected ==
Election	Member	Party
1993	Mikhail Vasilyev	Independent
1995	Mikhail Koshkin	Agrarian Party
1999	Svetlana Smirnova	Independent
2003	Svetlana Smirnova	United Russia
2007	Proportional representation - no election by constituency	
2011	Proportional representation - no election by constituency	
2016	Aleksey Zagrebin	United Russia
2021	Andrey Isayev	United Russia
2026	Andrey Isayev	United Russia

== Election results ==
=== 1993 ===
==== Declared candidates ====
- Zhaudat Akhtariyev (LDPR), journalist
- Viktor Kolupayev (Independent), Chairman of the Glazov City Council of People's Deputies (1990–present)
- Mikhail Vasilyev (Independent), Chairman of the Sharkansky District Council of People's Deputies (1990–present)

==== Results ====
Summary of the 12 December 1993 Russian legislative election in the Udmurtia constituency
Candidate	Party	Votes	%
Mikhail Vasilyev	Independent	125,267	42.69%
Zhaudat Akhtariyev	Liberal Democratic Party	–	–
Viktor Kolupayev	Independent	–	–
Total		293,438	100%

=== 1995 ===
==== Declared candidates ====
- Nikolay Bushmelev (K–TR–zSS), journalist
- Viktor Ganshin (Independent)
- Mikhail Koshkin (APR), Minister of Agriculture and Food of Udmurtia (1993–present)
- Mikhail Vasilyev (Independent), incumbent Member of State Duma (1994–present)

==== Results ====
Summary of the 17 December 1995 Russian legislative election in the Udmurtia constituency
Candidate	Party	Votes	%
Mikhail Koshkin	Agrarian Party	134,775	40.57%
Nikolay Bushmelev	Communists and Working Russia - for the Soviet Union	62,244	18.74%
Mikhail Vasilyev (incumbent)	Independent	45,787	13.78%
Viktor Ganshin	Independent	43,510	13.10%
against all		36,544	11.00%
Total		332,205	100%

=== 1999 ===
==== Declared candidates ====
- Mikhail Koshkin (Independent), incumbent Member of State Duma (1996–present)
- Valery Nikitin (Nikolayev–Fyodorov Bloc), engineering professor
- Vladimir Podoprigora (Independent), Deputy Governor of Novgorod Oblast (1996–present), former Member of Federation Council from Udmurtia (1994–1996)
- Klimenty Rogovets (Independent), Member of State Council of the Udmurt Republic (1995–present), Chief of the Gorky Railway Izhevsk Division
- Svetlana Smirnova (Independent), Deputy Chairwoman of the State Council of the Udmurt Republic (1999–present)

==== Withdrawn candidates ====
- Serafima Pushina-Blaginina (Independent), journalist, poet

==== Failed to qualify ====
- Viktor Konkin (Independent)
- Aleksandr Pershin (Independent)

==== Did not file ====
- Nadezhda Novoselova (LDPR), entrepreneur
- Yulia Root (DN)
- Aleksandr Shangin (Independent)

==== Results ====
Summary of the 19 December 1999 Russian legislative election in the Udmurtia constituency
Candidate	Party	Votes	%
Svetlana Smirnova	Independent	226,807	64.31%
Mikhail Koshkin (incumbent)	Independent	33,751	9.57%
Klementy Rogovets	Independent	23,953	6.79%
Vladimir Podoprigora	Independent	14,942	4.24%
Valery Nikitin	Andrey Nikolayev and Svyatoslav Fyodorov Bloc	10,837	3.07%
against all		34,978	9.92%
Total		352,688	100%

=== 2003 ===
==== Declared candidates ====
- Vladimir Bodrov (CPRF), aide to State Duma member
- Sergey Borodulin (Rodina), aikido master
- Vladimir Danilov (LDPR), businessman
- Vladimir Krasilnikov (APR), Member of Vavozhsky District Council of Deputies, kolkhoz chairman
- Svetlana Smirnova (United Russia), incumbent Member of State Duma (2000–present)
- Anatoly Verbitsky (NPRF), marketing executive
- Andrey Yedigarev (NK–AR), lawyer

==== Did not file ====
- Nikolay Murin (KPE), pipeline engineer
- Alina Smirnova (ORP Rus'), archive engineer

==== Results ====
Summary of the 7 December 2003 Russian legislative election in the Udmurtia constituency
Candidate	Party	Votes	%
Svetlana Smirnova (incumbent)	United Russia	243,507	67.64%
Vladimir Bodrov	Communist Party	33,294	9.25%
Vladimir Krasilnikov	Agrarian Party	17,570	4.88%
Vladimir Danilov	Liberal Democratic Party	11,666	3.24%
Sergey Borodulin	Rodina	5,812	1.61%
Andrey Yedigarev	New Course — Automobile Russia	5,218	1.45%
Anatoly Verbitsky	Independent	2,279	0.63%
against all		34,461	9.57%
Total		360,520	100%

=== 2016 ===
==== Declared candidates ====
- Sergey Butorin (GP), businessman, community activist
- Vladimir Chepkasov (CPRF), Member of State Council of the Udmurt Republic (2007–present), aide to State Duma member Nikolay Sapozhnikov, 2014 head candidate
- Aleksey Chulkin (Party of Growth), Member of State Council of the Udmurt Republic (2015–present), construction businessman
- Roman Dementyev (CPCR), Udmurt activist
- Viktor Shudegov (A Just Russia), Member of State Duma (2007–present)
- Timur Yagafarov (LDPR), Member of State Council of the Udmurt Republic (2012–present), engineer
- Aleksey Zagrebin (United Russia), director of the Udmurt Institute of History, Language, and Literature (2008–present)
- Ildar Zakirov (PARNAS), businessman

==== Declined ====
- Yelena Chirkova (United Russia), Member of State Council of the Udmurt Republic (2012–present), agriculture businesswoman (lost the primary)
- Nail Kutduzov (United Russia), Member of State Council of the Udmurt Republic (2012–present), utilities businessman (lost the primary)

==== Results ====
Summary of the 18 September 2016 Russian legislative election in the Udmurtia constituency
Candidate	Party	Votes	%
Aleksey Zagrebin	United Russia	110,562	43.47%
Aleksey Chulkin	Party of Growth	46,413	18.25%
Vladimir Chepkasov	Communist Party	38,192	15.02%
Viktor Shudegov	A Just Russia	20,919	8.23%
Timur Yagafarov	Liberal Democratic Party	15,457	6.08%
Roman Dementyev	Communists of Russia	6,609	2.60%
Sergey Butorin	Civic Platform	3,755	1.48%
Ildar Zakirov	People's Freedom Party	3,370	1.33%
Total		254,324	100%

=== 2021 ===
==== Declared candidates ====
- Pavel Berlinsky (New People), funeral businessman
- Aleksey Glukhov (Rodina), Member of Sarapul City Duma (2020–present), industrial executive
- Andrey Isayev (United Russia), Member of State Duma (2000–present)
- Valery Khodyrev (CPCR), former Member of State Council of the Udmurt Republic (1999–2007, 2012–2017)
- Lyudmila Korepanova (RPPSS), chairwoman of the party regional office, perennial candidate
- Georgy Leshchev (ZA!), chairman of the party regional office
- Aleksandr Syrov (CPRF), Member of Izhevsk City Duma (2020–present), businessman
- Farid Yunusov (SR–ZP), Member of State Council of the Udmurt Republic (2012–present), rector of Russian Academy of Medical-Social Rehabilitation, 2017 head candidate

==== Declined ====
- Aleksey Zagrebin (United Russia), incumbent Member of State Duma (2016–present) (ran on the party list)

==== Results ====
Summary of the 17-19 September 2021 Russian legislative election in the Udmurtia constituency
Candidate	Party	Votes	%
Andrey Isayev	United Russia	94,260	35.63%
Aleksandr Syrov	Communist Party	66,643	25.19%
Pavel Berlinsky	New People	19,258	7.28%
Lyudmila Korepanova	Party of Pensioners	18,644	7.05%
Farid Yunusov	A Just Russia — For Truth	18,002	6.81%
Aleksey Kuznetsov	Liberal Democratic Party	17,545	6.63%
Valery Khodyrev	Communists of Russia	8,102	3.06%
Aleksey Glukhov	Rodina	5,364	2.03%
Georgy Leshchev	Green Alternative	4,123	1.56%
Total		264,522	100%

=== 2026 ===
==== Declared candidates ====
- Ivan Gvozdak (CPRF), Member of Izhevsk City Duma (2025–present), aide to State Duma member Maria Drobot
- Andrey Isayev (United Russia), incumbent Member of State Duma (2000–present)
- Yury Mishkin (CPCR), perennial candidate, 2022 head candidate
- Maksim Tensin (LDPR), FC Izhevsk director
- Albert Zalyalov (A Just Russia), IT specialist
- Tatyana Zhuravlyova (New People), construction businesswoman

==== Results ====
Summary of the 18-20 September 2026 Russian legislative election in the Udmurtia constituency
Candidate	Party	Votes	%
Andrey Isayev (incumbent)	United Russia	124,488	44.85%
Ivan Gvozdak	Communist Party	44,290	15.96%
Tatyana Zhuravlyova	New People	43,325	15.61%
Maksim Tensin	Liberal Democratic Party	26,010	9.37%
Yury Mishkin	Communists of Russia	17,128	6.17%
Albert Zalyalov	A Just Russia	15,549	5.60%
Total		277,538	100%
