= Mozhga (inhabited locality) =

Mozhga (Russian: Можга) is the name of several inhabited localities in Russia.

Urban localities

- Mozhga, a town in the Udmurt Republic; administratively incorporated as a town of republic significance

Rural localities

- Mozhga, Republic of Bashkortostan, a village in Shudeksky Selsoviet of Yanaulsky District in the Republic of Bashkortostan
- Mozhga, Mozhginsky District, Udmurt Republic, a selo in Mozhginsky Selsoviet of Mozhginsky District in the Udmurt Republic
