= Yukamensky =

Yukamensky (masculine), Yukamenskaya (feminine), or Yukamenskoye (neuter) may refer to:

- Yukamensky District, a district of the Udmurt Republic, Russia
- Yukamenskoye, a rural locality (a selo) in the Udmurt Republic, Russia
