= Valamaz =

Set index of articles associated with the same name

Valamaz (Russian: Валамаз) is the name of several rural localities in the Udmurt Republic, Russia:

- Valamaz, Krasnogorsky District, Udmurt Republic, a selo in Valamazsky Selsoviet of Krasnogorsky District
- Valamaz, Seltinsky District, Udmurt Republic, a selo in Valamazsky Selsoviet of Seltinsky District
