= Kiyasovo =

Kiyasovo (Russian: Киясово) is the name of two rural localities in Russia:

- Kiyasovo, Moscow Oblast, a selo in Stupinsky District of Moscow Oblast
- Kiyasovo, Udmurt Republic, a selo in Kiyasovsky District of the Udmurt Republic
