= Kizner =

Kizner is the name of two rural localities in Kiznersky District of the Udmurt Republic, Russia:

- Kizner (selo), a selo in Kiznersky Selsoviet
- Kizner (settlement), a settlement in Lipovsky Selsoviet
