= Upper Uni =

Coordinates: 57°48′40″N 52°05′49″E

Upper Uni Верх-Уни Churivyl
- Selo
- Interactive map of Upper Uni
- Country: Russia
- Republic: Udmurtia
- Municipal area: Yukamensky
- Rural Settlement: Verkh-Uninskoe
- Elevation: 210 m (690 ft)

Population
  - Total: 301
- Time zone: UTC+4 (Samara Time)

Upper Uni is a village in Yukamensky District, Udmurtia, Russia. It is part of the Verkh-Uninsky rural settlement.

== Geography ==
The village is located near the river bank Uni. Highest point is 210 m above sea level.

=== Time zone ===
Verkh-Uni and the Udmurt Republic use Samara Time, which is set to UTC+4 all year.

== Population ==
The village had 386 residents in 2007, but experienced a sharp decline to 317 residents in 2010, followed by another decrease to 301 residents in 2012.

== Infrastructure ==
=== History of the church ===
Historically developing from a parish hub with the 1911 Transfiguration Church that was converted into a school in 1936, the infrastructure of Verkh-Uni expanded.

=== Modern infrastructure ===
Over the years to encompass a village council, a collective farm administration, a secondary school, a preschool, and seven streets.

=== Layout ===
The village features a network of seven streets: st. Youth, st. Podlesnaya, st. Polevaya, st. Sovetskaya, st. Sosnovaya, st. Churinskaya, and st. School. Within this layout, both the secondary school and the preschool are situated on School street, while the historical Transfiguration Church was located on st. Churinskaya.
