= Kez (disambiguation) =

Kez is a settlement in the Udmurt Republic, Russia.

Kez may also refer to:

- Kukelle, a language of Nigeria (ISO 639 kez)
- 99.9 KEZ, a US radio station from Phoenix, Arizona, see KESZ
- a given name:
  - Kez Evans
  - Kez McCorvey
