= Antropikha (Udmurtia) =

Coordinates: 57°47′32″N 52°02′20″E

Antropikha Антропиха
- Interactive map of Antropikha
- Country: Russia
- Republic: Udmurtia
- District: Yukamensky
- Municipal: Verkh-Uninskoye

Antropikha is a village in Yukamensky District, Udmurtia, Russia, included in the composition Verkh-Uninsky rural settlement.

== Population ==
In 2007, the population was 50 residents. In 2010, it fell to 40 residents, and by 2012, it rose to 44 residents.

== Infrastructure ==
The village has one street — Logovaya.
