= Administrative divisions of the Udmurt Republic =

Administrative districts of Russian federal subject

Udmurt Republic Russia
- Capital: Izhevsk

Administrative structure (as of 2013)
- Districts: 25
- Cities/towns: 6
- Urban-type settlements: 0
- Selsovets and rural settlements councils: 322

Municipal structure (as of 2002)
- Rural settlements: 2,059 (inhabited); 149 (uninhabited)

Udmurt Republic is a federal subject of Russia.

== Administrative and municipal divisions ==
Map

Division		Structure		OKATO	OKTMO	Urban-type settlement/ district-level town*	Rural
Division		Administrative	Municipal	OKATO	OKTMO	Urban-type settlement/ district-level town*	Rural
Izhevsk (Ижевск)		city	urban okrug	94 401	94 701		
↳	Industrialny (Индустриальный)	(under Izhevsk)	—N/a	94 401	—N/a		
↳	Leninsky (Ленинский)	(under Izhevsk)	—N/a	94 401	—N/a		
↳	Oktyabrsky (Октябрьский)	(under Izhevsk)	—N/a	94 401	—N/a		
↳	Pervomaysky (Первомайский)	(under Izhevsk)	—N/a	94 401	—N/a		
↳	Ustinovsky (Устиновский)	(under Izhevsk)	—N/a	94 401	—N/a		
Votkinsk (Воткинск)		city	urban okrug	94 410	94 710		
Glazov (Глазов)		city	urban okrug	94 420	94 720		
Mozhga (Можга)		city	urban okrug	94 430	94 730		
Sarapul (Сарапул)		city	urban okrug	94 440	94 740		
Alnashsky (Алнашский)		district		94 202	94 602		12 selsovets
Balezinsky (Балезинский)		district		94 204	94 604		17 selsovets
Vavozhsky (Вавожский)		district		94 206	94 606		10 selsovets
Votkinsky (Воткинский)		district		94 208	94 608		12 selsovets
Glazovsky (Глазовский)		district		94 210	94 610		16 selsovets
Grakhovsky (Граховский)		district		94 212	94 612		8 selsovets
Debyossky (Дебёсский)		district		94 214	94 614		10 selsovets
Zavyalovsky (Завьяловский)		district		94 216	94 616		19 selsovets
Igrinsky (Игринский)		district		94 218	94 618		14 selsovets; 1 rural settlement council
Kambarsky (Камбарский)		district		94 220	94 620	Kambarka (Камбарка) town*	6 selsovets
Karakulinsky (Каракулинский)		district		94 222	94 622		13 selsovets; 1 rural settlement council
Kezsky (Кезский)		district		94 224	94 624		15 selsovets
Kiyasovsky (Киясовский)		district		94 226	94 626		8 selsovets
Kiznersky (Кизнерский)		district		94 228	94 628		17 selsovets
Krasnogorsky (Красногорский)		district		94 230	94 630		10 selsovets
Malopurginsky (Малопургинский)		district		94 233	94 633		15 selsovets
Mozhginsky (Можгинский)		district		94 235	94 635		19 selsovets
Sarapulsky (Сарапульский)		district		94 237	94 637		17 selsovets
Seltinsky (Селтинский)		district		94 239	94 639		9 selsovets
Syumsinsky (Сюмсинский)		district		94 241	94 641		8 selsovets
Uvinsky (Увинский)		district		94 244	94 644		19 selsovets
Sharkansky (Шарканский)		district		94 246	94 646		15 selsovets
Yukamensky (Юкаменский)		district		94 248	94 648		8 selsovets
Yakshur-Bodyinsky (Якшур-Бодьинский)		district		94 250	94 650		12 selsovets
Yarsky (Ярский)		district		94 252	94 652		10 selsovets; 1 rural settlement council
