= Viktor Shudegov =

Russian politician (1952–2020)

- Виктор Шудегов

State Duma deputy
- In office 21 December 2007 – 5 October 2016

Senator from Udmurtia
- In office 17 April 2001 – 7 December 2007
- Succeeded by: Alexander Chekalin

Personal details
- Born: 5 December 1952 Tortym, RSFSR, Soviet Union
- Died: 16 May 2020 (aged 67)
- Party: A Just Russia
- Education: Udmurt State University; Leningrad State University

Military service
- Branch/service: Soviet Armed Forces
- Unit: Central Asian Military District

Viktor Evgrafovich Shudegov (Russian: Виктор Евграфович Шудегов; Tortym, 5 December 1952 – Moscow, 16 May 2020) was a Russian scientist and politician. He served as Chairman of the Committee on Science, Culture, Education, Healthcare and Ecology of the Federation Council of the Federal Assembly of the Russian Federation, Deputy of the State Duma of the Federal Assembly of the Russian Federation, Deputy Chairman of the Education Committee of the State Duma of the Russian Federation, and Chairman of the Council of the regional branch of the "A Just Russia" party in the Udmurt Republic.

== Biography ==
He was born on December 5, 1952, in the village of Tortym of the Kezsky District of the Udmurt ASSR. In 1975 he graduated with honors from the Udmurt State University with a degree in physics, and in 1975-1976 he studied at the Leningrad State University of the USSR Ministry of Higher Education.

In 1976-1977 he served in the Soviet Armed Forces (Central Asian Military District); from 1977 to 1980 he carried out postgraduate studies at the Leningrad State University. From 1980 to 1990 he worked as electronic engineer, computer center assistant, senior lecturer and associate professor of the Udmurt state University (Izhevsk). In 1990-1993 he attended doctoral studies at the Leningrad State university.

From 1994 to 1999 he was Professor, Head of the Department of Physics and Mechanics of New Materials, Rector of the Institute of Regional Studies, and Vice-Rector for Scientific Work of the Udmurt State university.

From 1999 to 2000 he served as Deputy Chairman of the Government of the Udmurt Republic (supervising the State Committee for Science and Higher Education of the Udmurt Republic, the Ministry of Education, the Ministry of Culture, the Ministry of Press and Information, the Ministry of Social Protection, the State Committee for Youth Affairs).

In 2000-2001 he was Chairman of the State Committee of the Udmurt Republic for Science, Higher and Secondary Professional Education (Izhevsk). On April 17, 2001, he became a representative of the Government of the Udmurt Republic in the Federation Council.

From 2002 to 2007 he served as Chairman of the Federation Council Committee on Science, Culture, Education, Healthcare and Ecology, and was a member of the Federation Council Commission on the Methodology for Exercising the Constitutional Powers of the Federation Council.

In December 2007 he was elected as Deputy of the 5th State Duma and became Deputy Chairman of the Committee for Education of the State Duma of the Russian Federation.

He was consistently included in the TOP-50 of the general "Rating of lawmakers" and in the TOP-30 of the "Rating of lawmakers" from the opposition. He developed over 100 legislative initiatives aimed at combating corruption, protecting the interests of children and their parents, researchers, teachers and students, pensioners.

He was president of GLOBE-Russia (World Organization of Parliamentarians for a Balanced Environment), Doctor of Physical and Mathematical Sciences, Academician of the Russian Academy of Natural Sciences, and member of the International Academy of Informatization, International Academy of Sciences of Ecology, Human Security and Nature, and member of the General Council of the IPC "EKORECYCLING".

Shudegov wrote over 380 scientific papers on science, education, social protection of the population, ecology, solid state physics, nanotechnology, articles on normative, technical and innovative activities in science and higher education.

As a lawmaker, he was known for a number of initiatives, including equating ridicule at the teacher with insulting a government official, as well as prohibiting officials from entering into government contracts with companies where their relatives work in leadership positions.

Shudegov died in Moscow on May 16, 2020, at age 67, from COVID-19, during the pandemic in Russia.

== Honours and awards ==
- Honoured Scientist of the Russian Federation (2003)
- Medal of the Order "For Merit to the Fatherland", II class (2016)
- Honorary Worker of Higher Professional Education of the Russian Federation
- Honorary Badge of the State Duma of the Russian Federation "For services in the development of parliamentarism" (2014)
- Medal "In Commemoration of the 1000th Anniversary of Kazan" (2005)
- Cavalier of the Golden Badge of Honor "Public Recognition" (2003)
- Medal "Council of Federation 15 years" (2008)
- Awarded certificates of honor of the Federation Council of the Russian Federation, the State Duma of the Russian Federation, the Government of the Russian Federation.
