= Senteg =

Rural locality in Zavyalovsky District, Udmurt Republic, Russia

Coordinates: 56°57′58″N 52°52′22″E

Senteg (Russian: Сентег) is a rural locality (a village) in Kiyaiksky Selsoviet of Zavyalovsky District of the Udmurt Republic, Russia, located 24 kilometers (15 mi) northwest of Izhevsk, the capital city of the republic. The village has a population of 51 (2003 est.). Its dialing code is +7 3412 and its postal code is 427030.
