= Andrey Isayev =

Russian politician

- Андрей Исаев
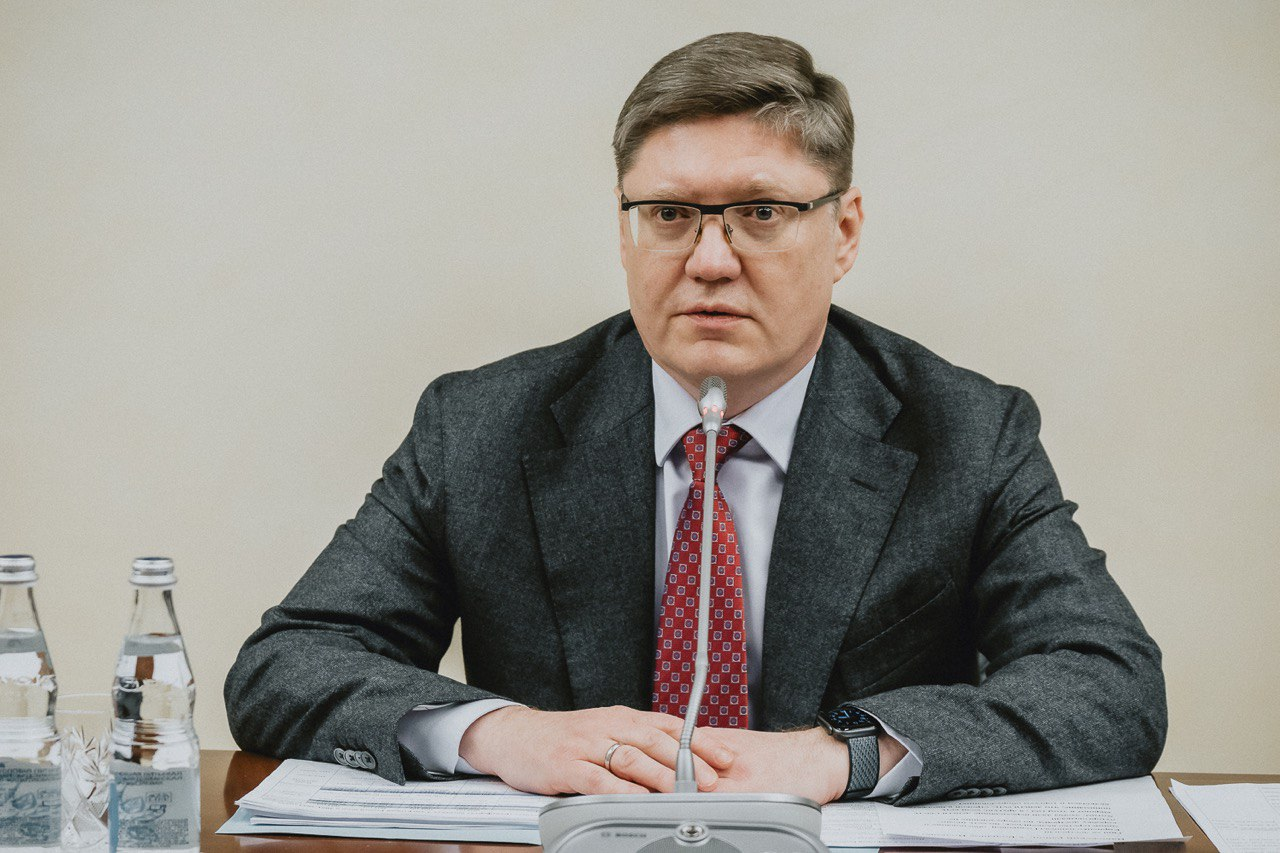
- Isayev in 2022

Member of the State Duma for Udmurtia
- Incumbent
- Assumed office 12 October 2021
- Preceded by: Aleksey Zagerbin
- Constituency: Udmurtia (No. 33)

Member of the State Duma (Party List Seat)
- In office 18 January 2000 – 12 October 2021

Personal details
- Born: 9 October 1971 (age 55) Moscow, Russian SFSR, USSR
- Party: United Russia
- Education: Moscow State Pedagogical University

Andrey Konstantinovich Isayev (Russian: Андрей Константинович Исаев; born 9 October 1971) is a Russian political figure and a deputy of the 3rd, 4th, 5th, 6th, 7th, and 8th State Dumas.

== Biography ==
Isaev is a grandson of a Soviet politician and People's Commissar of Local Industry of the RSFSR, Konstantin Ukhanov. In 2000, Andrey Isayev was awarded a Doctor of Sciences in Political Science. From 1986 to 1991, he was a member of several political organizations, including the Moscow People's Front (aiming to build "democratic socialism") and Confederation of Anarcho-Syndicalists. From 1995 to 2001, he was a secretary of the Federation of Independent Trade Unions of Russia. In December 1999, he was elected deputy of the 3rd State Duma. Two years later, he became a member of the United Russia. From 2003 to 2011, he was the deputy of the 4th and 5th State Dumas. In March 2011, Isayev was appointed the first vice-chairman of the Federation of Independent Trade Unions of Russia. In December 2011, he was re-elected as deputy of the 6th State Duma. From 2014 to 2016, he was Deputy to the Chairman of the State Duma of the Russian Federation Sergey Naryshkin. Later he was appointed deputy chairman of United Russia. In 2016 and 2021, he was re-elected deputy of the 7th and 8th State Dumas respectively.

Isayev was involved in several public scandals. For instance, in 2012, he was appointed deputy secretary to the parliamentary leader of United Russia Sergey Neverov. However, soon Isayev was fired after making a drunken brawl on board. Later Isaev was reinstated in the party. In 2012, opposition leader Dmitry Gudkov accused Isaev in owning an undeclared "Orthodox hotel" in Germany that rents rooms to Christian tourists with the purpose of earning money.

Isaev is known for his active support of the Dima Yakovlev Law.
