= Sharkan =

Rural locality in Udmurtia, Russia

Coordinates: 57°18′05″N 53°52′16″E

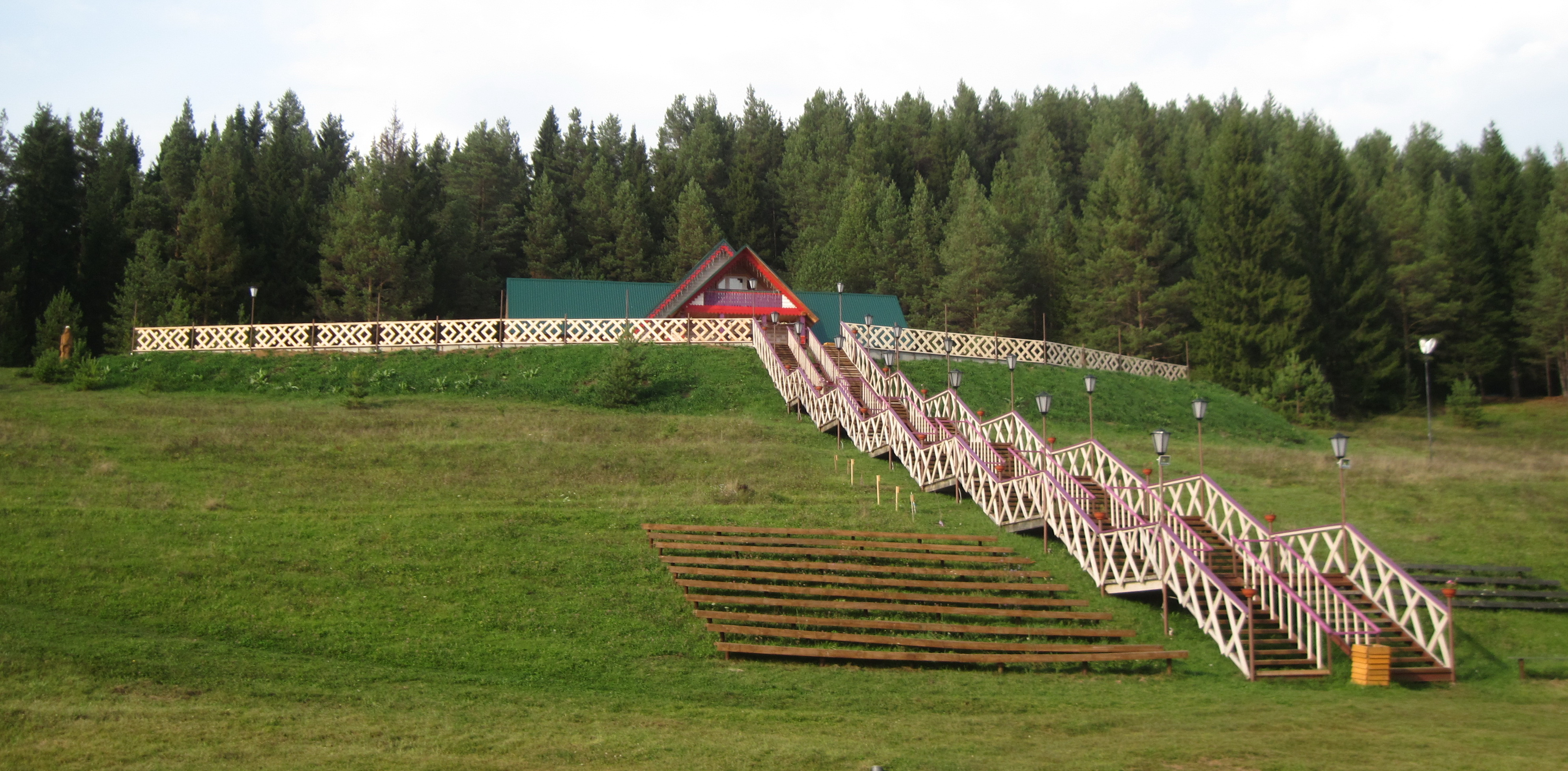
The residence of the Udmurt Father Frost in Sharkan

Sharkan (Russian: Шарка́н, Udmurt: Шаркан, Šarkan) is a rural locality (a selo) and the administrative center of Sharkansky District, Udmurtia, Russia. Population: 6,614 (2010 census); 6,596 (2002 census); 6,532 (1989 Soviet census).
