= Mozhga, Republic of Bashkortostan =

Mozhga Можга
- Village
- Location within Bashkortostan Location within Russia
- Coordinates: 56°14′N 54°49′E
- Country: Russia
- Region: Bashkortostan
- District: Yanaulsky District
- Time zone: UTC+5:00

Mozhga (Russian: Можга; Bashkir: Можға, Mojğa) is a rural locality (a village) in Shudeksky Selsoviet, Yanaulsky District, Bashkortostan, Russia. The population was 154 as of 2010. There are 2 streets.

== Geography ==
Mozhga is located 11 km southwest of Yanaul (the district's administrative centre) by road. Nokrat is the nearest rural locality.
