= Selty =

Rural locality in Udmurtia, Russia

Coordinates: 57°18′33″N 52°08′17″E

Selty (Russian: Селты, Udmurt: Сьӧлта, Śölta) is a rural locality (a selo) and the administrative center of Seltinsky District, Udmurtia, Russia. Population: 5,276 (2010 census); 5,585 (2002 census); 5,846 (1989 Soviet census).
