= Debyosy =

Debyosy Дебёсы
- Selo
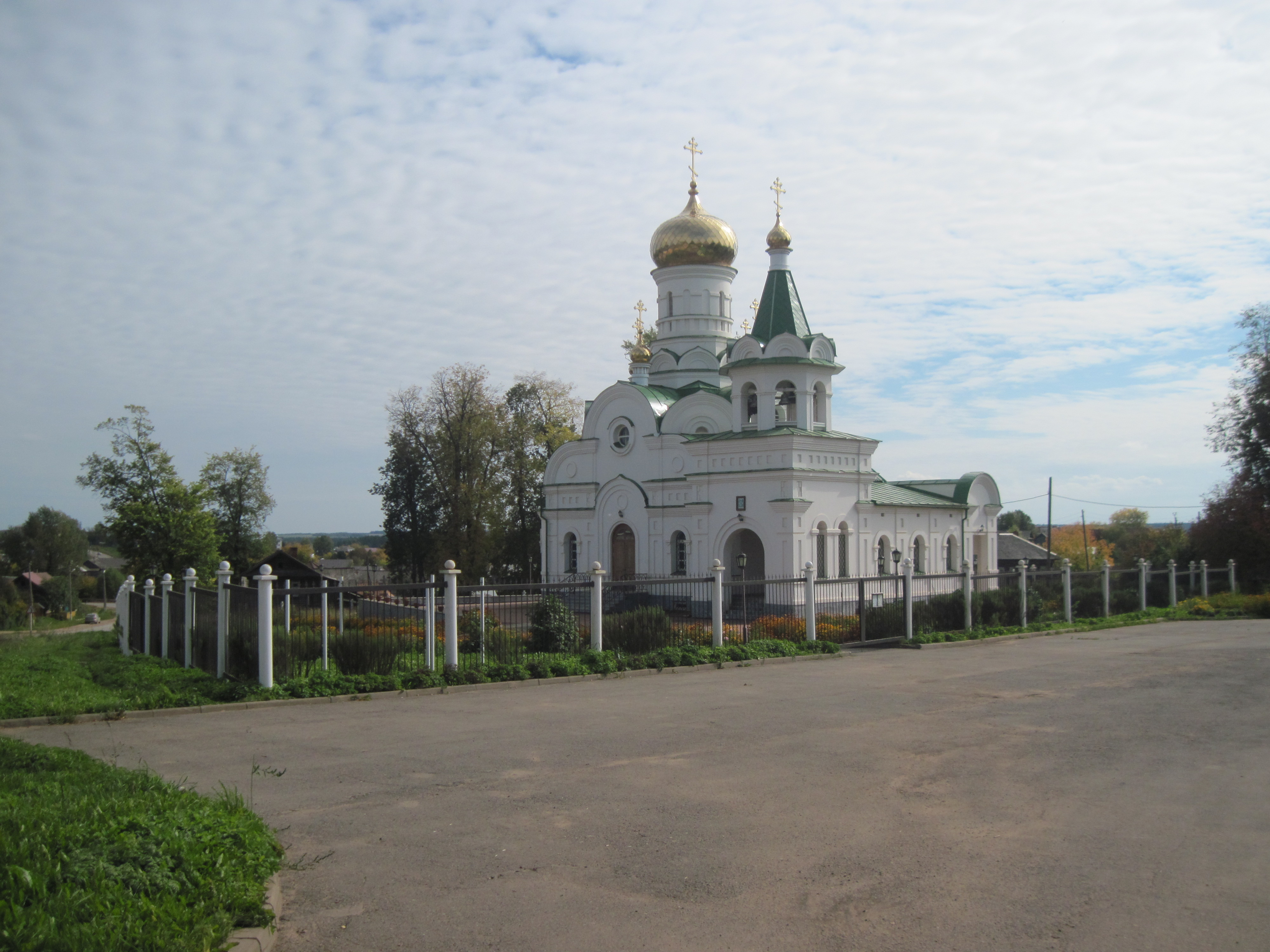
- Debyosy church

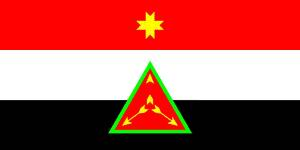
- Flag Coat of arms
- Interactive map of Debyosy
- Location of Debyosy Debyosy (Udmurt Republic)
- Coordinates: 57°39′N 53°49′E
- Country: Russia
- Federal subject: Udmurtia
- Administrative district: Debyossky District

Population (2010 Census)
  - Total: 5,720
  - Estimate (2021): 5,663 (−1%)

Administrative status
  - Capital of: Debyossky District
- Time zone: UTC+4 (MSK+1)
- Postal code: 427060
- OKTMO ID: 94614415101

Debyosy (Russian: Дебёсы; Udmurt: Дэбес, Debes) is a rural locality (a selo) and the administrative center of Debyossky District of the Udmurt Republic, Russia. The population has been fairly constant at 5,720 (2010 census); 5,828 (2002 census); 5,383 (1989 Soviet census).
