= Syumsi =

Rural locality in Udmurtia, Russia

Coordinates: 57°06′33″N 51°36′22″E

Syumsi (Russian: Сюмси, Udmurt: Сюмси) is a rural locality (a selo) and the administrative center of Syumsinsky District, Udmurtia, Russia. Population: 5,316 (2010 census); 5,645 (2002 census); 5,534 (1989 Soviet census).
