= Karakulino, Karakulinsky District, Udmurt Republic =

Rural locality in Karakulinsky District, Udmurt Republic, Russia

Coordinates: 56°01′N 53°42′E

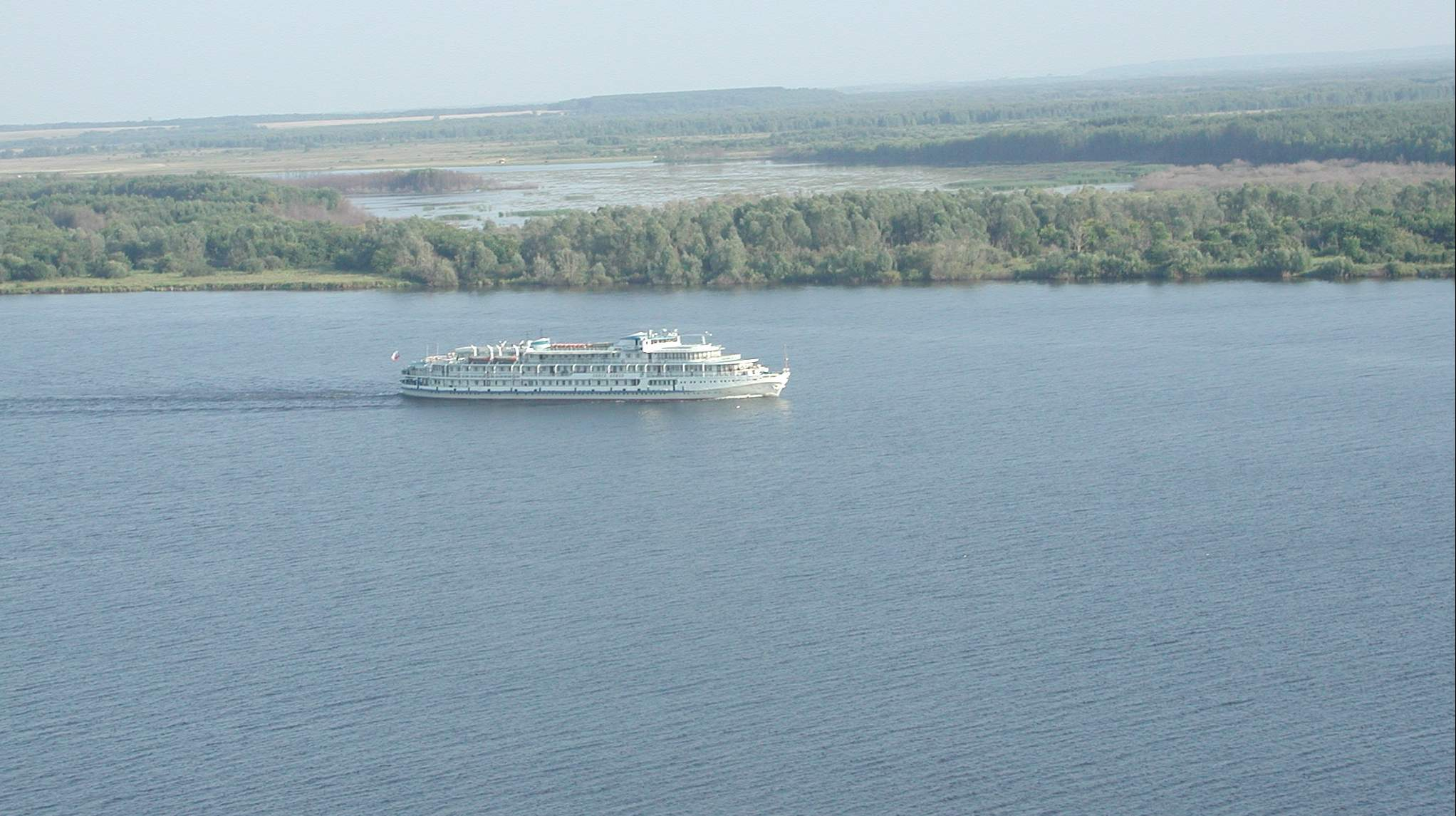
an image of Karakulino, Karakulinsky District, Udmurt Republic

Karakulino (Russian: Каракулино) is a rural locality (a selo) and the administrative center of Karakulinsky District in the Udmurt Republic, Russia. Population: 4,814 (2010 census); 5,109 (2002 census); 5,144 (1989 Soviet census).
