= Yakshur-Bodya =

Rural locality in Udmurtia, Russia

Coordinates: 57°11′18″N 53°09′16″E

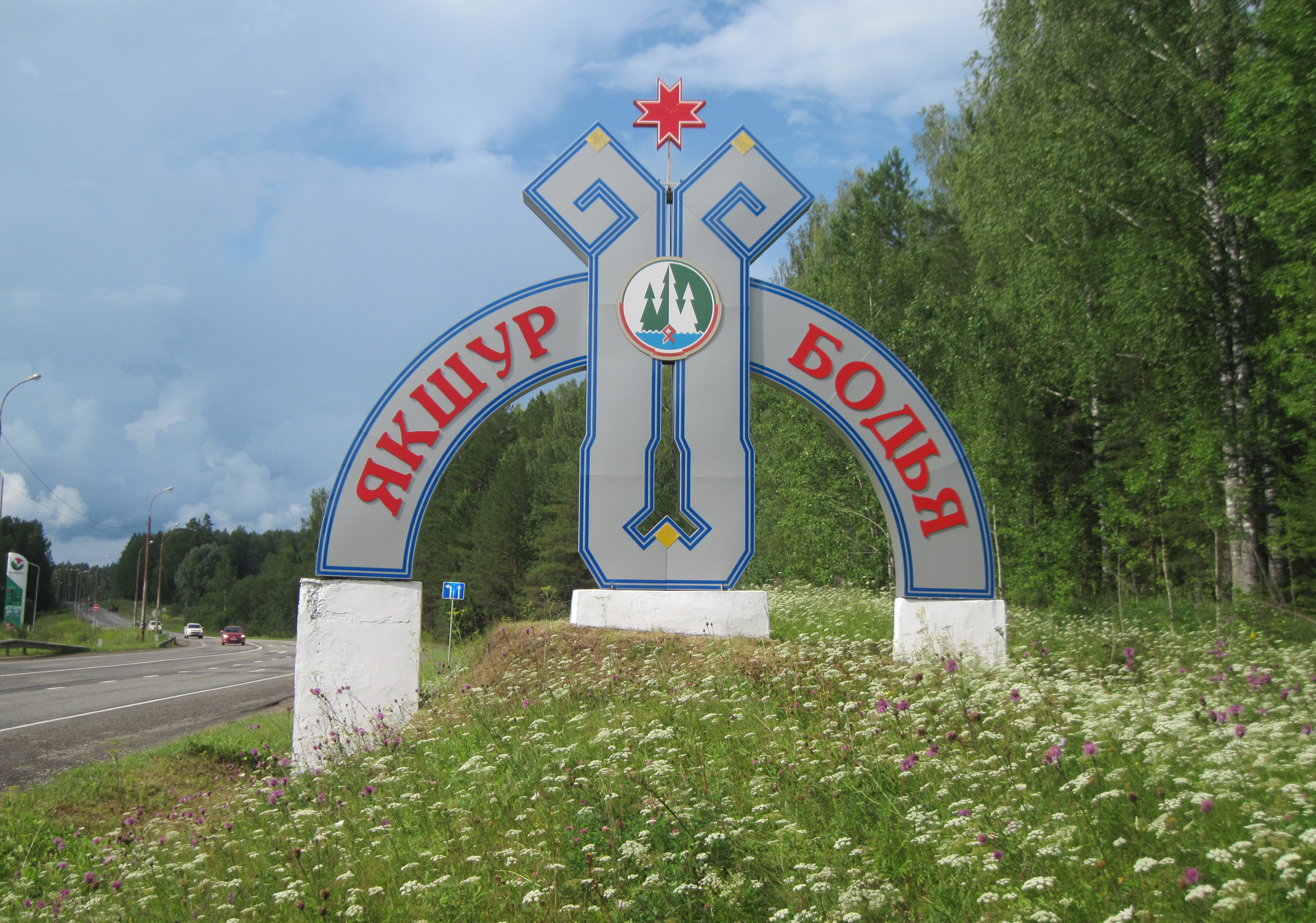
Entrance to the village Yakshur-Bodya

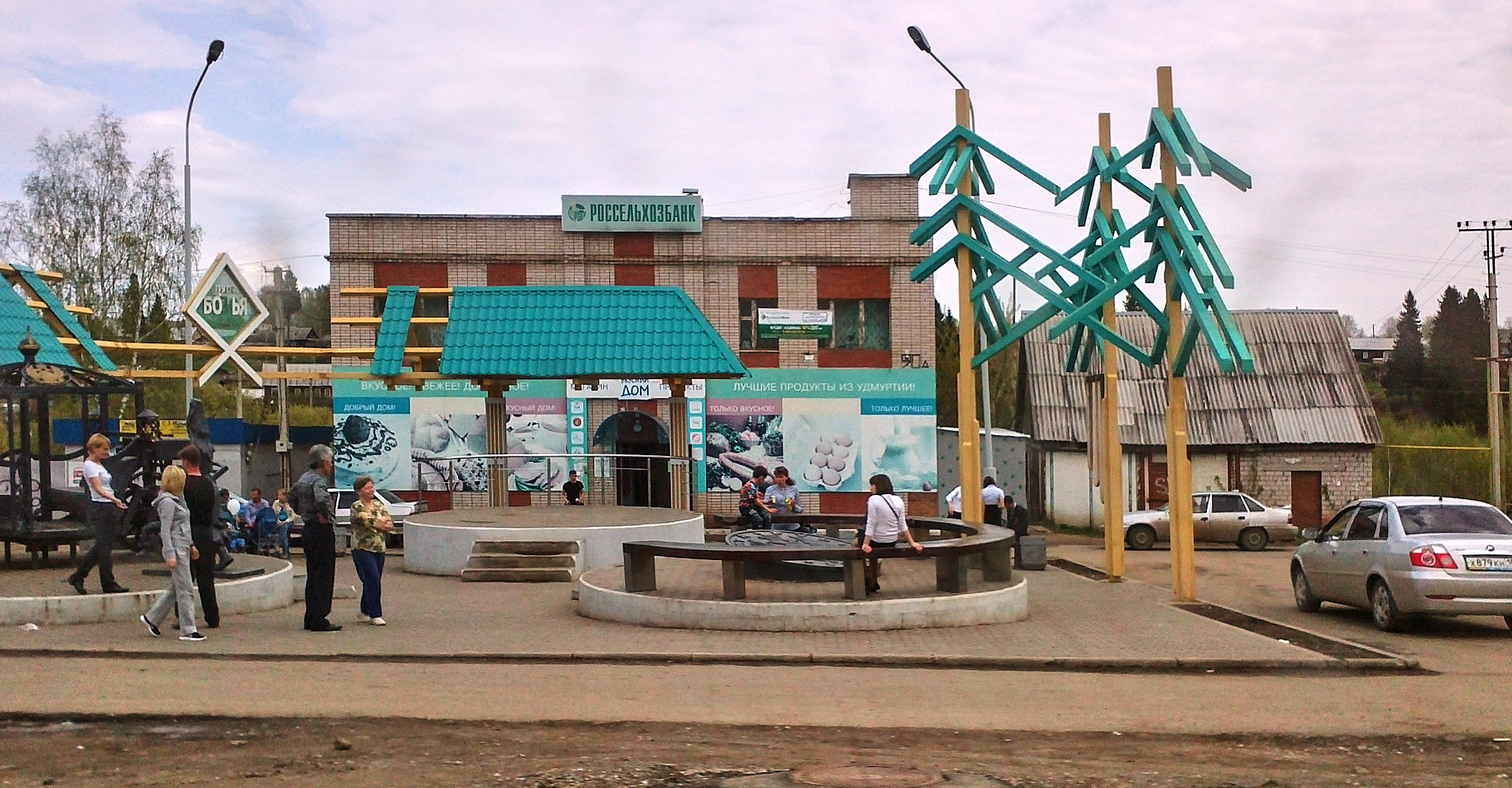
The central square

Flag of Yakshur-Bodya

Yakshur-Bodya (Russian: Якшур-Бодья, Udmurt: Якшур-Бӧдья, Jakšur-Böďja) is a rural locality (a selo) and the administrative center of Yakshur-Bodyinsky District, Udmurtia, Russia. Population: 7,252 (2010 census); 6,944 (2002 census); 6,548 (1989 Soviet census).
