= Krasnogorskoye, Udmurt Republic =

Krasnogorskoye Красногорское
- Selo
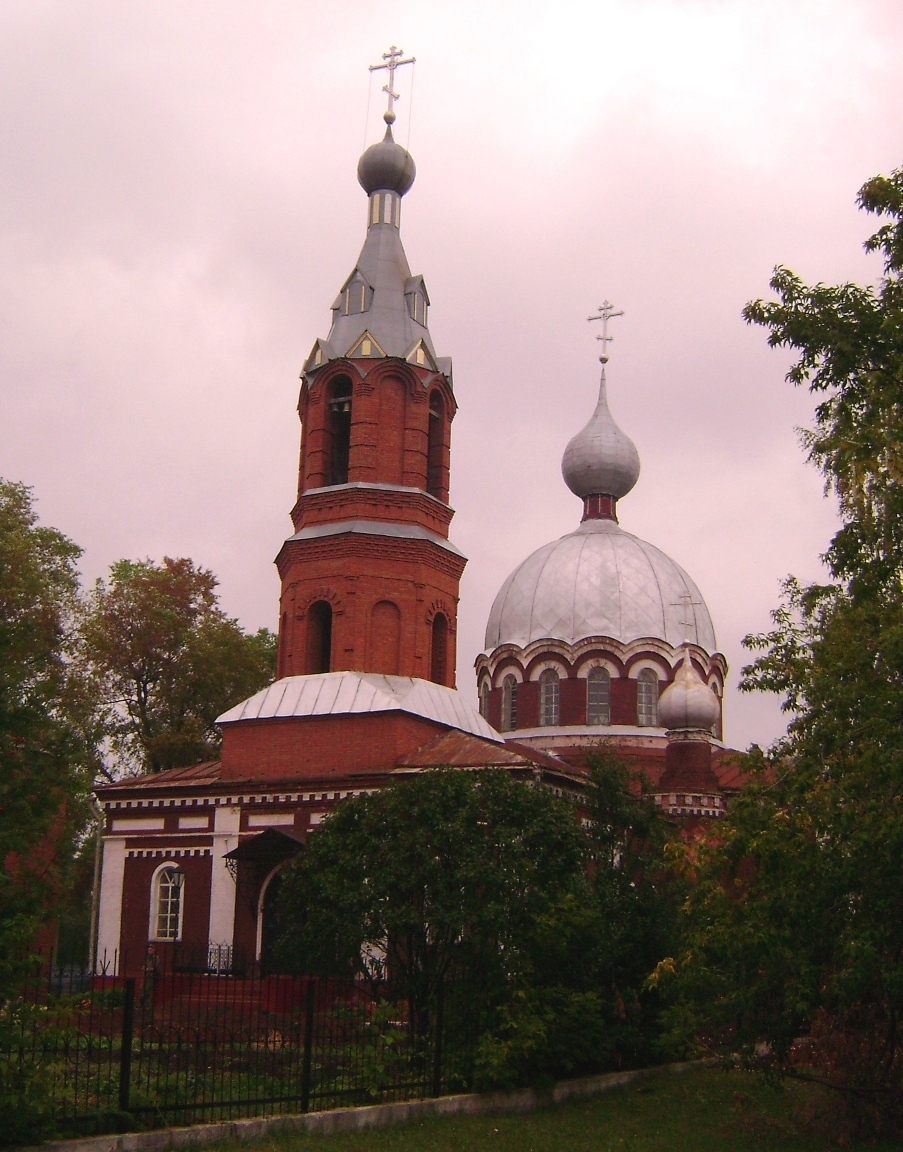

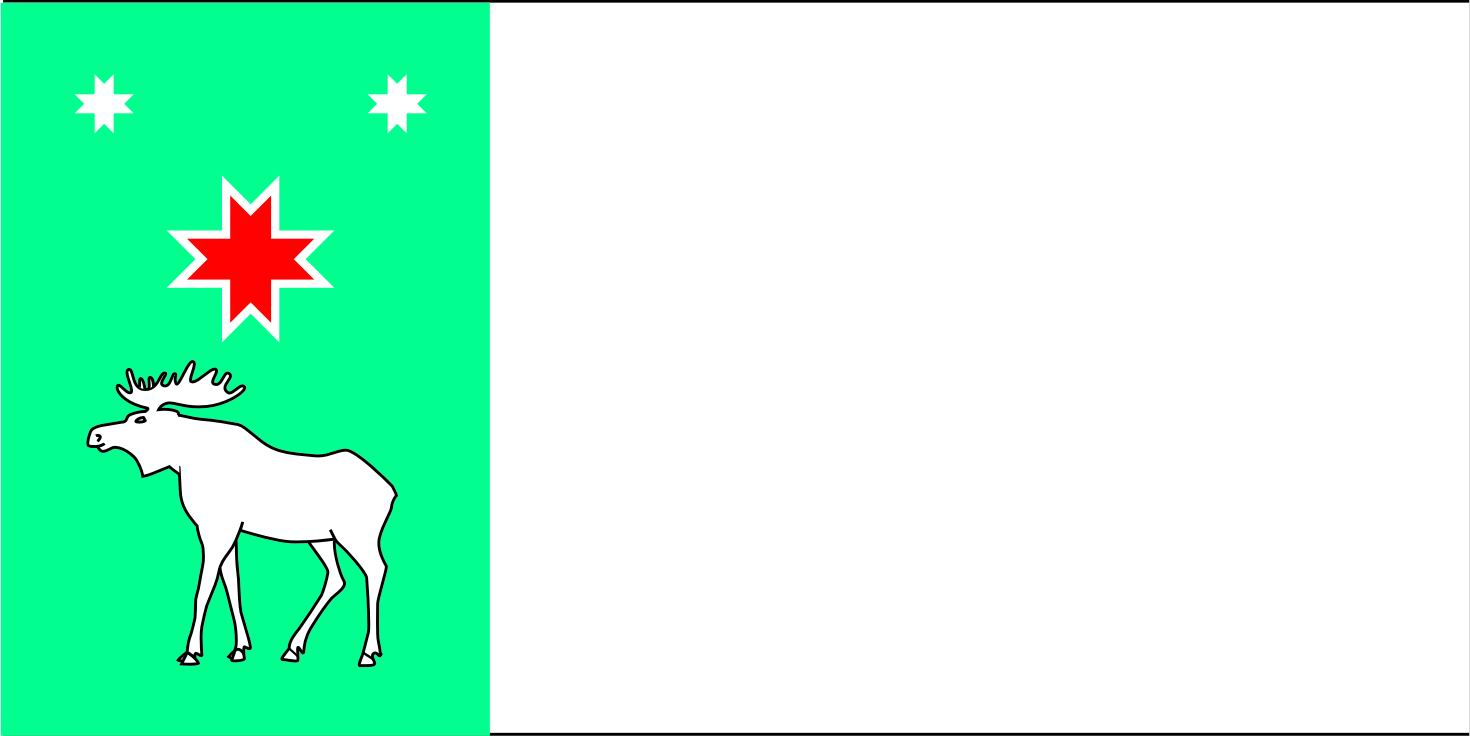
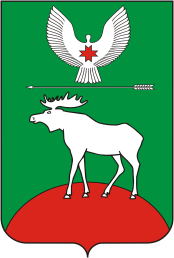
- Flag Coat of arms
- Interactive map of Krasnogorskoye
- Location of Krasnogorskoye Krasnogorskoye (Udmurt Republic)
- Coordinates: 57°42′25″N 52°29′49″E
- Country: Russia
- Federal subject: Udmurtia
- Administrative district: Krasnogorsky District

Population (2010 Census)
  - Total: 4,425
  - Estimate (2021): 3,855 (−12.9%)

Administrative status
  - Capital of: Krasnogorsky District
- Time zone: UTC+4 (MSK+1)
- Postal code: 427650
- OKTMO ID: 94630466101

Krasnogorskoye (Russian: Красного́рское) is a rural locality (a selo) and the administrative center of Krasnogorsky District in the Udmurt Republic, Russia. Population: 4,425 (2010 census); 4,559 (2002 census); 4,684 (1989 Soviet census).
