= Chur, Udmurt Republic =

Rural locality in Yakshur-Bodyinsky District, Udmurt Republic, Russia

Coordinates: 57°06′49″N 52°58′01″E

Chur (Russian: Чур) is a settlement in Yakshur-Bodyinsky District of the Udmurt Republic, Russia.
