= Debyossky District =

Debyossky District Дебёсский район (Russian)
- District

Other transcription(s)
  - Udmurt: Дэбес ёрос
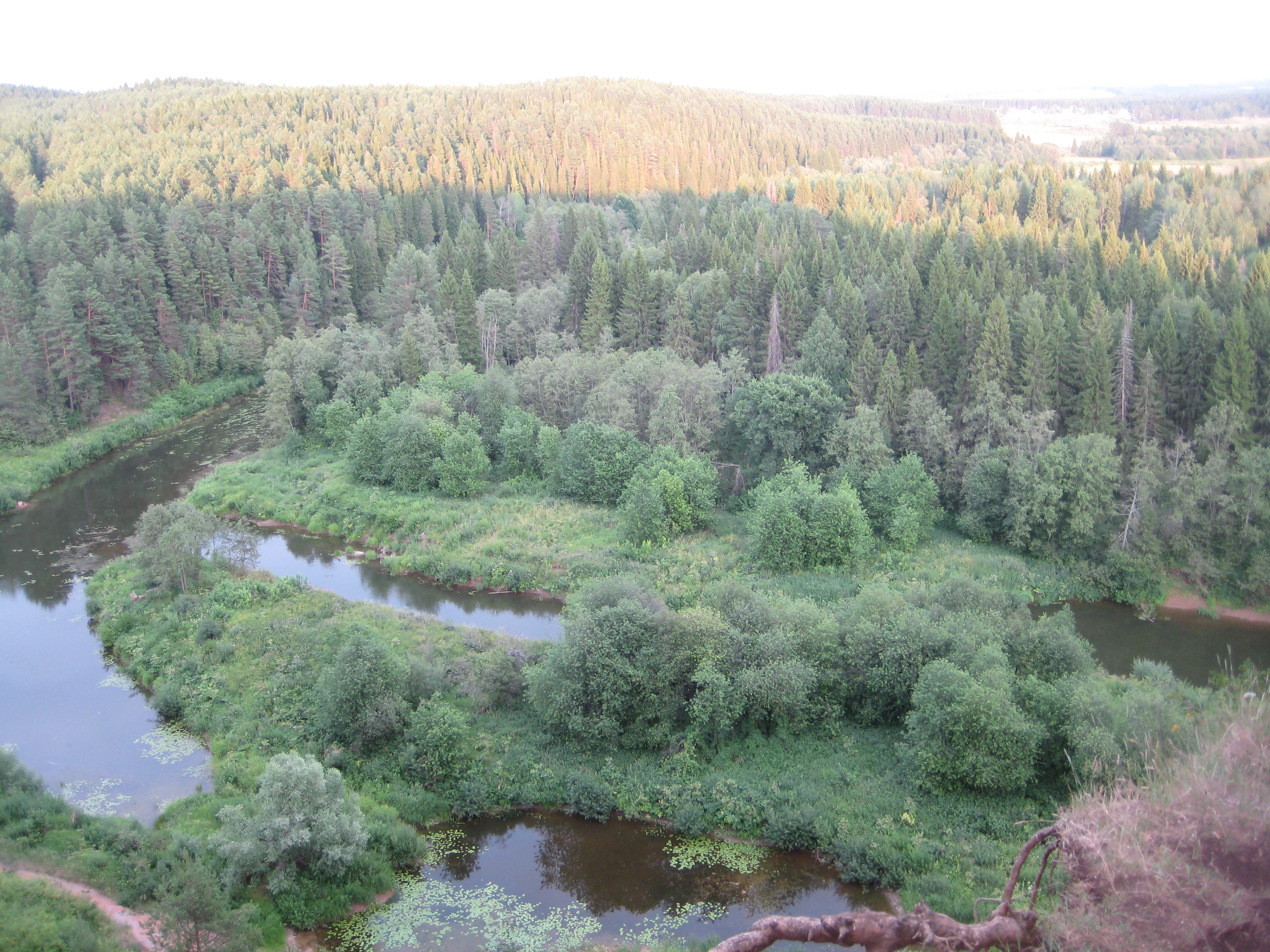
- Baygurezo tract, Debyossky District

- Flag Coat of arms
- Location of Debyossky District in the Udmurt Republic
- Coordinates: 57°39′N 53°49′E
- Country: Russia
- Federal subject: Udmurt Republic
- Established: 15 July 1929
- Administrative center: Debyosy

Area
  - Total: 1,033 km^{2} (399 sq mi)

Population (2010 Census)
  - Total: 12,665
  - Density: 12.26/km^{2} (31.75/sq mi)
  - Urban: 0%
  - Rural: 100%

Administrative structure
  - Administrative divisions: 10 selsoviet
  - Inhabited localities: 61 rural localities

Municipal structure
  - Municipally incorporated as: Debyossky Municipal District
  - Municipal divisions: 0 urban settlements, 10 rural settlements
- Time zone: UTC+4 (MSK+1)
- OKTMO ID: 94614000
- Website: http://debesy.udmurt.ru/

Debyossky District (Russian: Дебёсский райо́н; Udmurt: Дэбес ёрос, Debes joros) is an administrative and municipal district (raion), one of the twenty-five in the Udmurt Republic, Russia. It is located in the northeast of the republic. The area of the district is 1,033 square kilometers (399 sq mi). Its administrative center is the rural locality (a selo) of Debyosy. Population: 12,665 (2010 census); 14,085 (2002 Census); 13,981 (1989 Soviet census). The population of Debyosy accounts for 45.2% of the district's total population.

== Geography ==
The Cheptsa River flows through the district from east to west. Others rivers of significance include the Ita, the Pykhta, the Medlo, the Il, the Irymka, and others.

== History ==
The district was created on July 15, 1929 by merging Debyosskaya and Polomskaya Volosts of Glazovsky Uyezd with Tylovayskaya Volost of Izhevsky Uyezd. In 1962, the district was abolished and merged into Kezsky District, but it was restored in 1965.

== Demographics ==
Ethnically, the population of the district consists mostly of the Udmurt people (79%) and Russians (19.7)%.
