= Zavyalovo, Udmurt Republic =

Rural locality in Udmurtia, Russia

Coordinates: 56°47′32″N 53°22′32″E

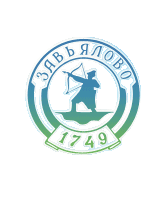
Coat of arms of Zavyalovo

Zavyalovo (Russian: Завья́лово, Udmurt: Дэри / Завьял, Deri / Zavjal) is a rural locality (a selo) and the administrative center of Zavyalovsky District, Udmurtia, Russia. Population: 8,986 (2010 census); 7,457 (2002 census); 6,830 (1989 Soviet census).
