= Kizner (settlement) =

Kizner Кизнер
- Settlement
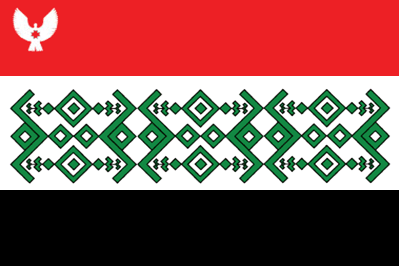
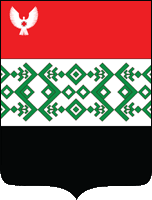
- Flag Coat of arms
- Interactive map of Kizner
- Location of Kizner Kizner (Udmurt Republic)
- Coordinates: 56°17′N 51°31′E
- Country: Russia
- Federal subject: Udmurtia
- Administrative district: Kiznersky District

Population (2010 Census)
  - Total: 9,536
  - Estimate (2021): 9,284 (−2.6%)
- Time zone: UTC+4 (MSK+1)
- Postal codes: 427710–427712, 427714
- OKTMO ID: 94626435101

Kizner (Russian: Кизне́р) is a rural locality (a settlement) and the administrative center of Kiznersky District in the Udmurt Republic, Russia. Population: 9,536 (2010 census); 9,957 (2002 census); 9,894 (1989 Soviet census).

It had urban-type settlement status until May 2007.
