= Sharkansky District =

Sharkansky District Шарканский район (Russian)
- District

Other transcription(s)
  - Udmurt: Шаркан ёрос
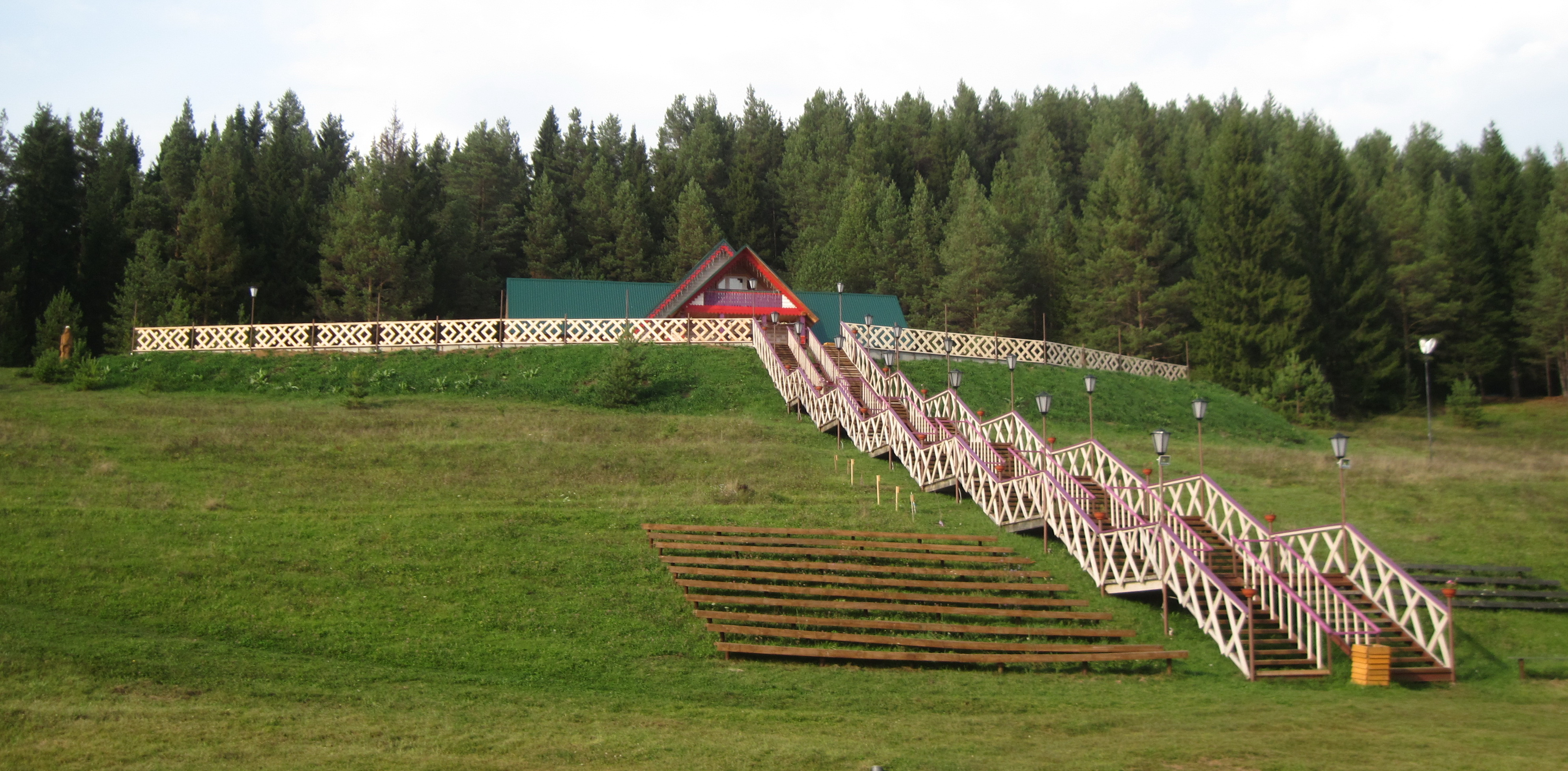
- Manor house in Sharkansky District

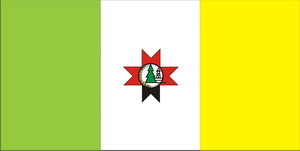
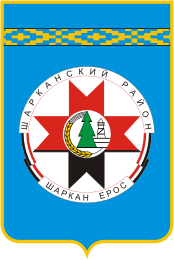
- Flag Coat of arms
- Location of Sharkansky District in the Udmurt Republic
- Coordinates: 57.328°N 53.582°E
- Country: Russia
- Federal subject: Udmurt Republic
- Established: 15 July 1929
- Administrative center: Sharkan

Area
  - Total: 1,404.5 km^{2} (542.3 sq mi)

Population (2010 Census)
  - Total: 19,100
  - Density: 13.6/km^{2} (35.2/sq mi)
  - Urban: 0%
  - Rural: 100%

Administrative structure
  - Administrative divisions: 15 selsoviet
  - Inhabited localities: 91 rural localities

Municipal structure
  - Municipally incorporated as: Sharkansky Municipal District
  - Municipal divisions: 0 urban settlements, 15 rural settlements
- Time zone: UTC+4 (MSK+1)
- OKTMO ID: 94646000
- Website: http://sharkan.udmurt.ru/

Sharkansky District (Russian: Шарка́нский райо́н; Udmurt: Шаркан ёрос, Šarkan joros) is an administrative and municipal district (raion), one of the twenty-five in the Udmurt Republic, Russia. It is located in the east of the republic. The area of the district is 1,404.5 square kilometers (542.3 sq mi). Its administrative center is the rural locality (a selo) of Sharkan. Population: 19,100 (2010 census); 21,384 (2002 Census); 21,487 (1989 Soviet census). The population of Sharkan accounts for 34.6% of the district's total population.
