= Yakshur-Bodyinsky District =

Yakshur-Bodyinsky District Якшур-Бодьинский район (Russian)
- District

Other transcription(s)
  - Udmurt: Якшур-Бӧдья ёрос
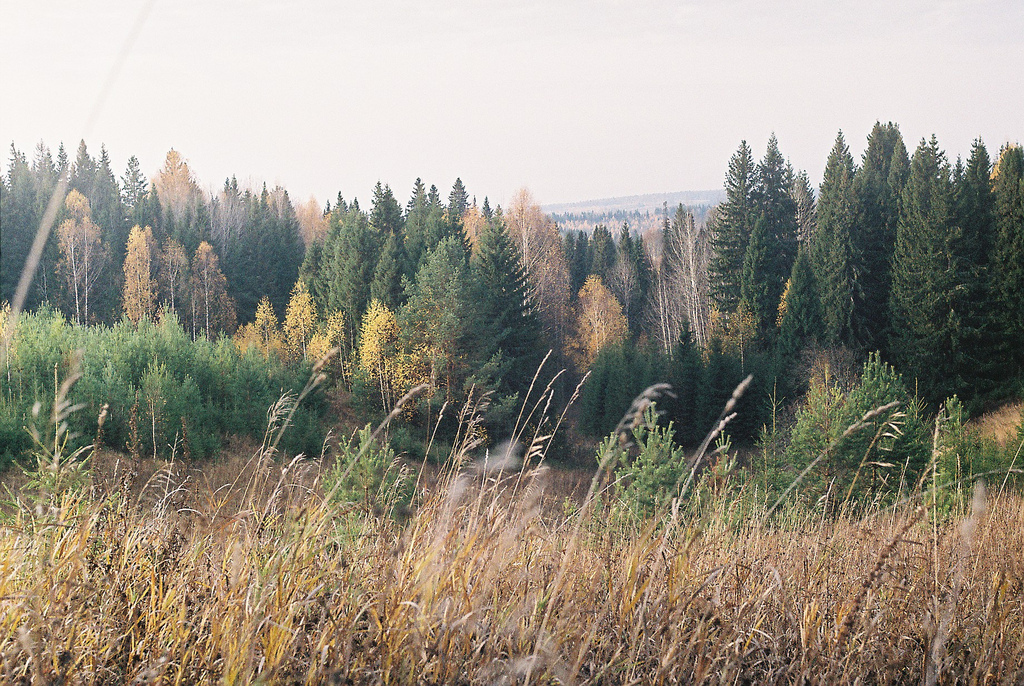
- A forest near the village of Pushkari in Yakshur-Bodyinsky District

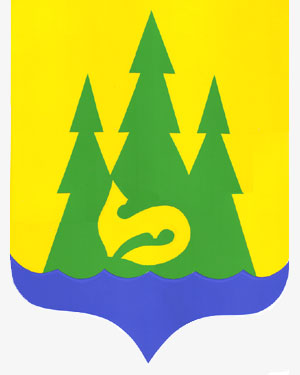
- Flag Coat of arms
- Location of Yakshur-Bodyinsky District in the Udmurt Republic
- Coordinates: 57.193°N 52.718°E
- Country: Russia
- Federal subject: Udmurt Republic
- Established: 15 July 1929
- Administrative center: Yakshur-Bodya

Area
  - Total: 1,780.1 km^{2} (687.3 sq mi)

Population (2010 Census)
  - Total: 21,467
  - Density: 12.059/km^{2} (31.234/sq mi)
  - Urban: 0%
  - Rural: 100%

Administrative structure
  - Administrative divisions: 12 selsoviet
  - Inhabited localities: 80 rural localities

Municipal structure
  - Municipally incorporated as: Yakshur-Bodyinsky Municipal District
  - Municipal divisions: 0 urban settlements, 12 rural settlements
- Website: http://www.bodia.ru/

Yakshur-Bodyinsky District (Russian: Якшу́р-Бо́дьинский райо́н; Udmurt: Якшур-Бӧдья ёрос, Jakšur-Böďja joros) is an administrative and municipal district (raion), one of the twenty-five in the Udmurt Republic, Russia. It is located in the center of the republic. The area of the district is 1,780.1 square kilometers (687.3 sq mi). Its administrative center is the rural locality (a selo) of Yakshur-Bodya. Population: 21,467 (2010 census); 22,599 (2002 Census); 22,964 (1989 Soviet census). The population of Yakshur-Bodya accounts for 33.8% of the district's total population.

== See also ==
- Chur, Udmurt Republic
