= Karakulinsky District =

Karakulinsky District Каракулинский район (Russian)
- District

Other transcription(s)
  - Udmurt: Каракулино ёрос
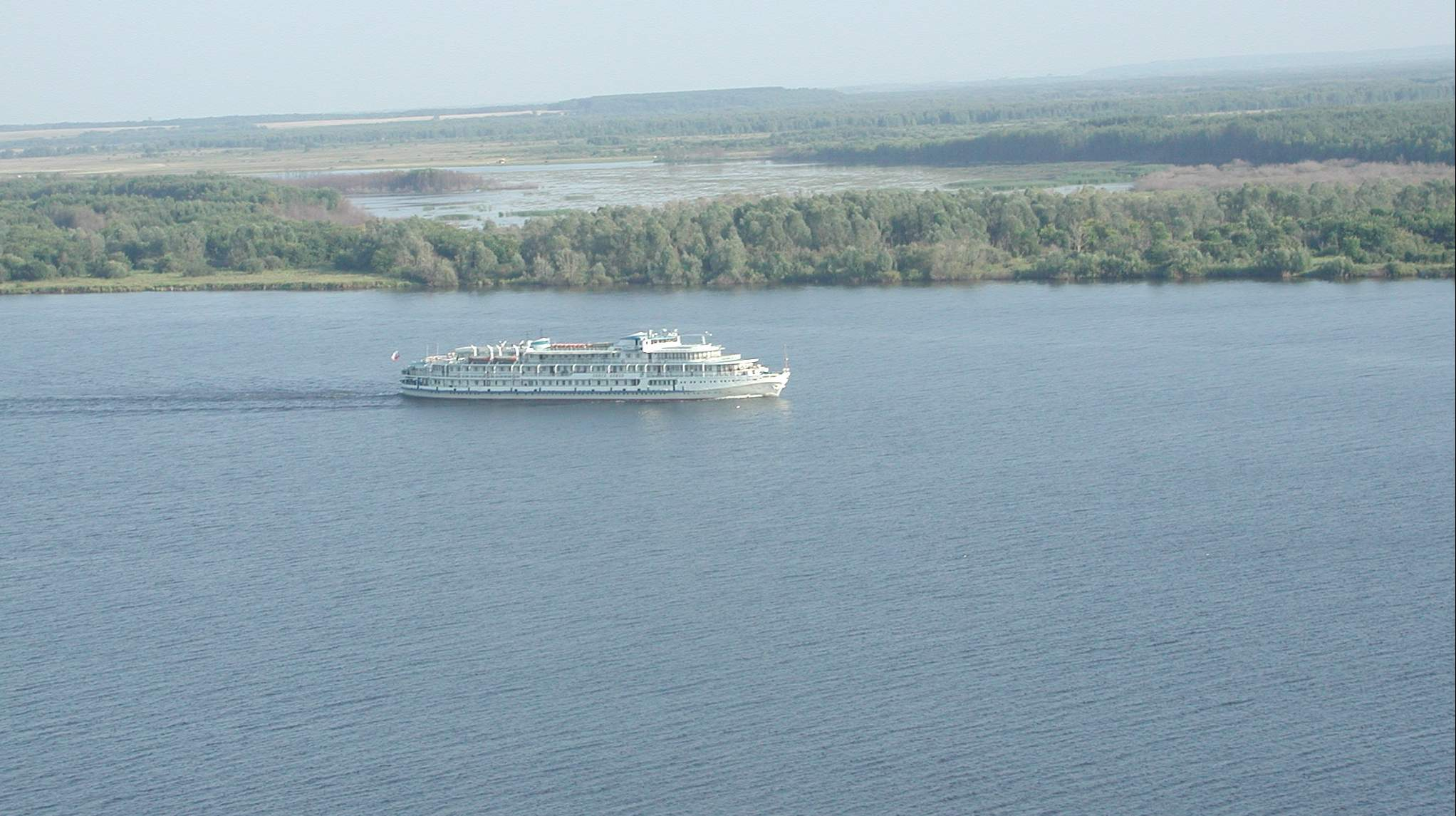
- View of the Kama River from Karakulino

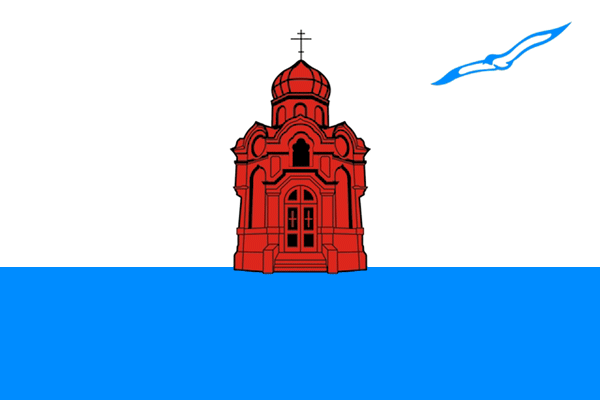
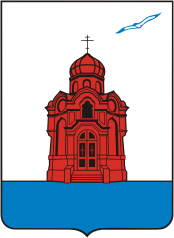
- Flag Coat of arms
- Location of Karakulinsky District in the Udmurt Republic
- Coordinates: 56.048°N 53.408°E
- Country: Russia
- Federal subject: Udmurt Republic
- Established: 4 November 1926
- Administrative center: Karakulino

Area
  - Total: 1,192.6 km^{2} (460.5 sq mi)

Population (2010 Census)
  - Total: 12,230
  - Density: 10.25/km^{2} (26.56/sq mi)
  - Urban: 0%
  - Rural: 100%

Administrative structure
  - Administrative divisions: 13 selsoviet
  - Inhabited localities: 32 rural localities

Municipal structure
  - Municipally incorporated as: Karakulinsky Municipal District
  - Municipal divisions: 0 urban settlements, 12 rural settlements
- Time zone: UTC+4 (MSK+1)
- OKTMO ID: 94522000
- Website: http://karakulino.udmurt.ru/

Karakulinsky District (Russian: Кара́кулинский райо́н; Udmurt: Каракулино ёрос, Karakulino joros) is an administrative and municipal district (raion), one of the twenty-five in the Udmurt Republic, Russia. It is located in the southeast of the republic. The area of the district is 1,192.6 square kilometers (460.5 sq mi). Its administrative center is the rural locality (a selo) of Karakulino. Population: 12,230 (2010 census); 13,835 (2002 Census); 14,620 (1989 Soviet census). The population of Karakulino accounts for 39.4% of the district's total population.
