= Kez =

Rural locality in Kezsky District, Udmurt Republic, Russia

Coordinates: 57°53′36″N 53°42′39″E

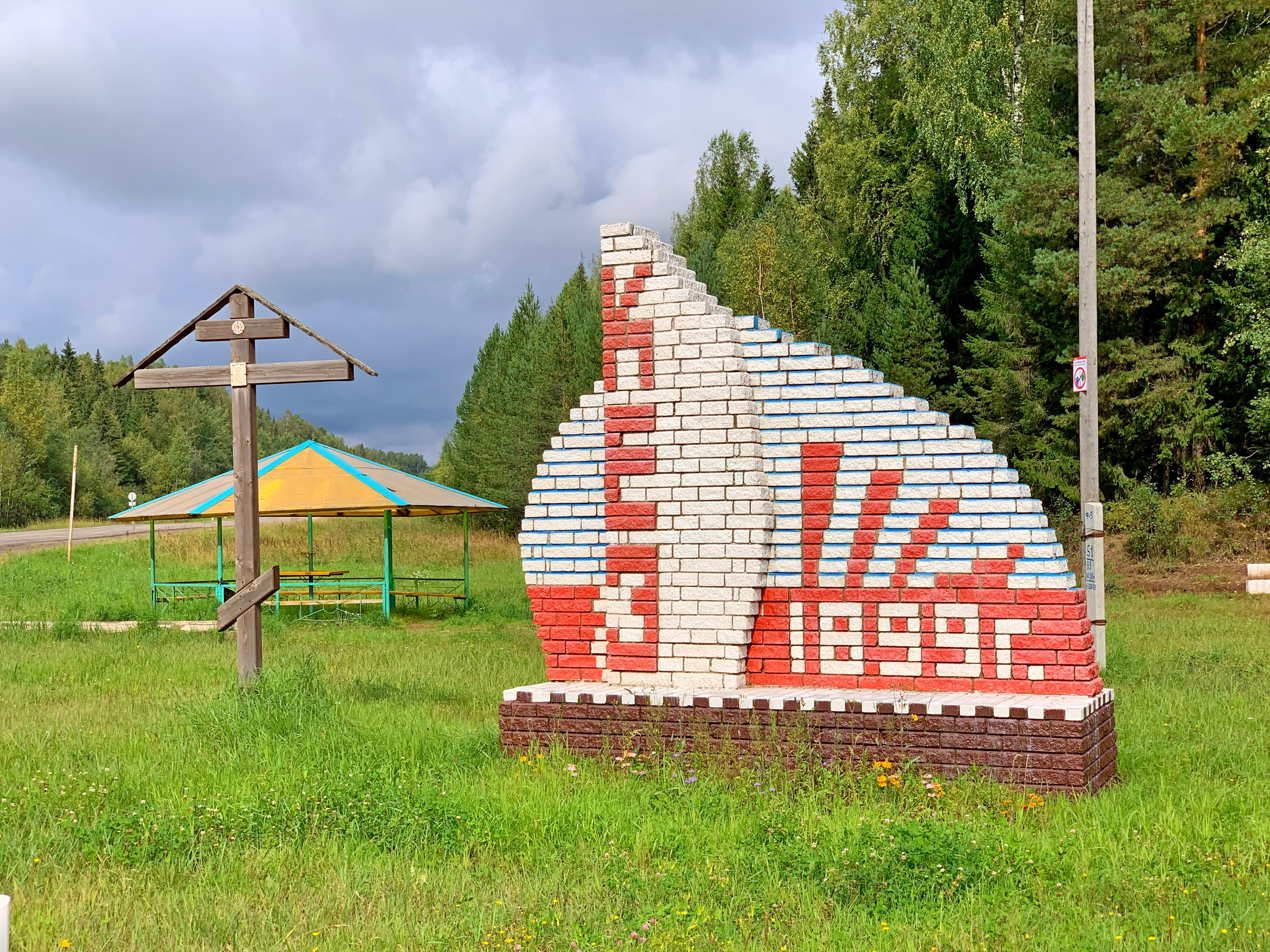
Stele at the entrance to the village

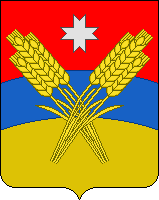
Coat of arms of Kez

Kez (Russian: Кез) is a rural locality (a settlement) and the administrative center of Kezsky District of the Udmurt Republic, Russia, located 169 kilometers (105 mi) northeast of Izhevsk. Population: 11,080 (2010 census); 10,913 (2002 census); 10,030 (1989 Soviet census).

== History ==
It was founded in 1895 due to the construction of a railway. It served as the administrative center of the district since 1929. It was granted urban-type settlement status in 1942, but was demoted back to a rural locality in 2008.

== Economy ==
There are several light and food industry companies; among them a cheese factory ("Kezsky syrzavod").

The settlement serves as a railway station on the Kirov–Perm line.
