= Mozhginsky District =

Mozhginsky District Можгинский район (Russian)
- District

Other transcription(s)
  - Udmurt: Можга ёрос
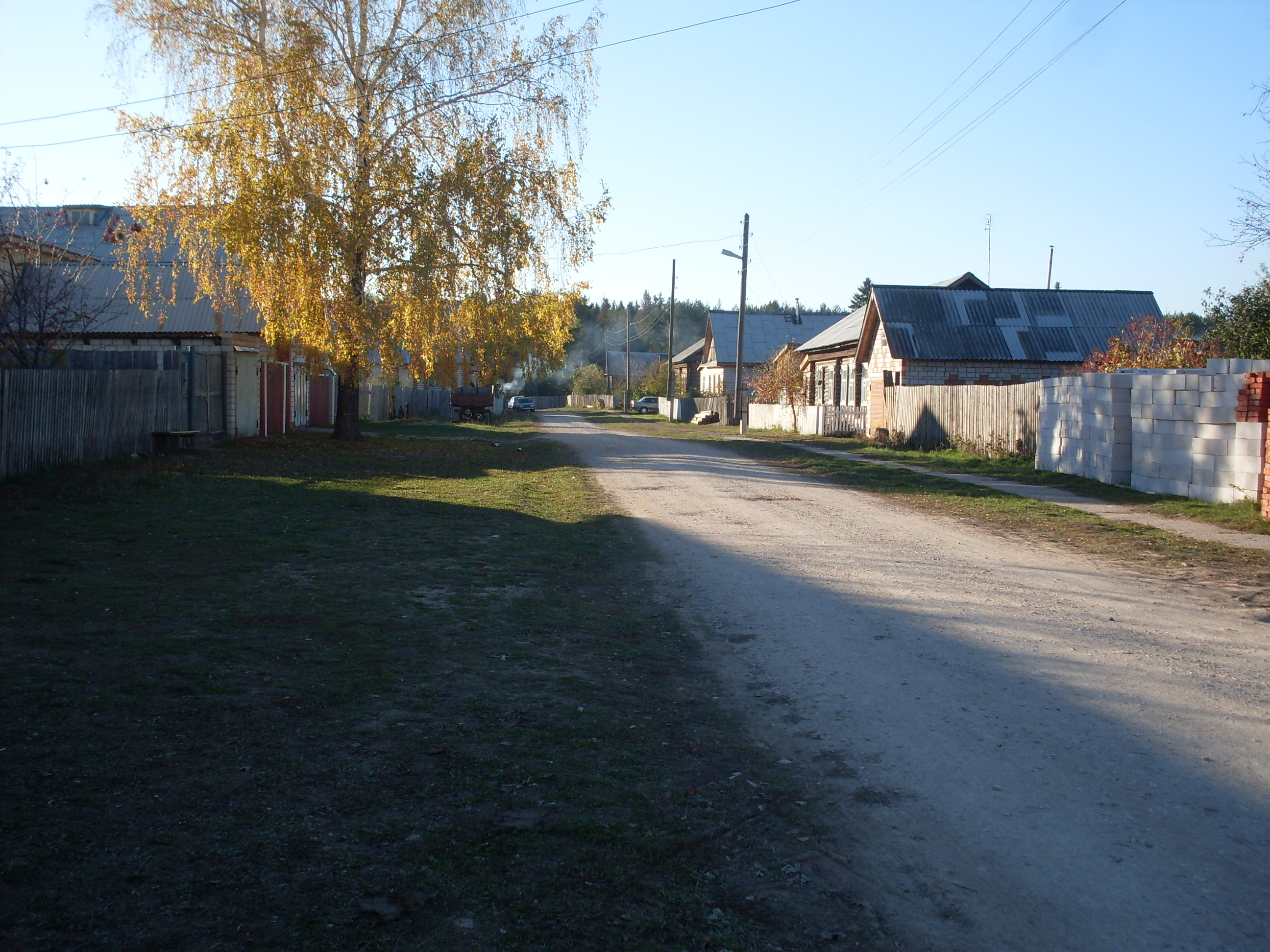
- The selo of Gornyak in Mozhginsky District

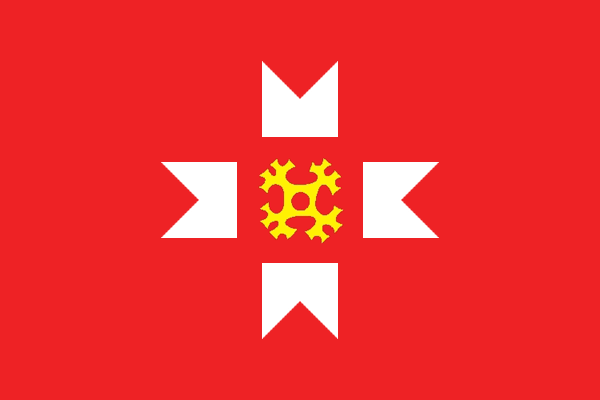
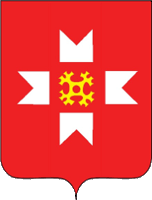
- Flag Coat of arms
- Location of Mozhginsky District in the Udmurt Republic
- Coordinates: 56.450°N 51.724°E
- Country: Russia
- Federal subject: Udmurt Republic
- Established: 15 July 1929
- Administrative center: Mozhga

Area
  - Total: 1,997 km^{2} (771 sq mi)

Population (2010 Census)
  - Total: 28,293
  - Density: 14.17/km^{2} (36.69/sq mi)
  - Urban: 0%
  - Rural: 100%

Administrative structure
  - Administrative divisions: 19 Selsoviets
  - Inhabited localities: 112 rural localities

Municipal structure
  - Municipally incorporated as: Mozhginsky Municipal District
  - Municipal divisions: 0 urban settlements, 13 rural settlements
- Time zone: UTC+4 (MSK+1)
- OKTMO ID: 94635000
- Website: http://www.mozhga-rayon.ru

Mozhginsky District (Russian: Можги́нский райо́н; Udmurt: Можга ёрос, Možga joros) is an administrative and municipal district (raion), one of the twenty-five in the Udmurt Republic, Russia. It is located in the southwest of the republic. The area of the district is 1,997 square kilometers (771 sq mi). Its administrative center is the town of Mozhga (which is not administratively a part of the district). Population: 28,293 (2010 census); 30,358 (2002 Census); 30,236 (1989 Soviet census).

== Geography ==
The Vala River is the main river in the district.

== Administrative and municipal status ==
Within the framework of administrative divisions, Mozhginsky District is one of the twenty-five in the republic. The town of Mozhga serves as its administrative center, despite being incorporated separately as a town of republic significance—an administrative unit with the status equal to that of the districts.

As a municipal division, the district is incorporated as Mozhginsky Municipal District. The town of republic significance of Mozhga is incorporated separately from the district as Mozhga Urban Okrug.

== Demographics ==
Ethnic composition (according to the 2002 Census):

- Udmurt people: 64%
- Russians: 30%
- Tatars and other: 4%
