= Syumsinsky District =

Syumsinsky District Сюмсинский район (Russian)
- District

Other transcription(s)
  - Udmurt: Сюмси ёрос
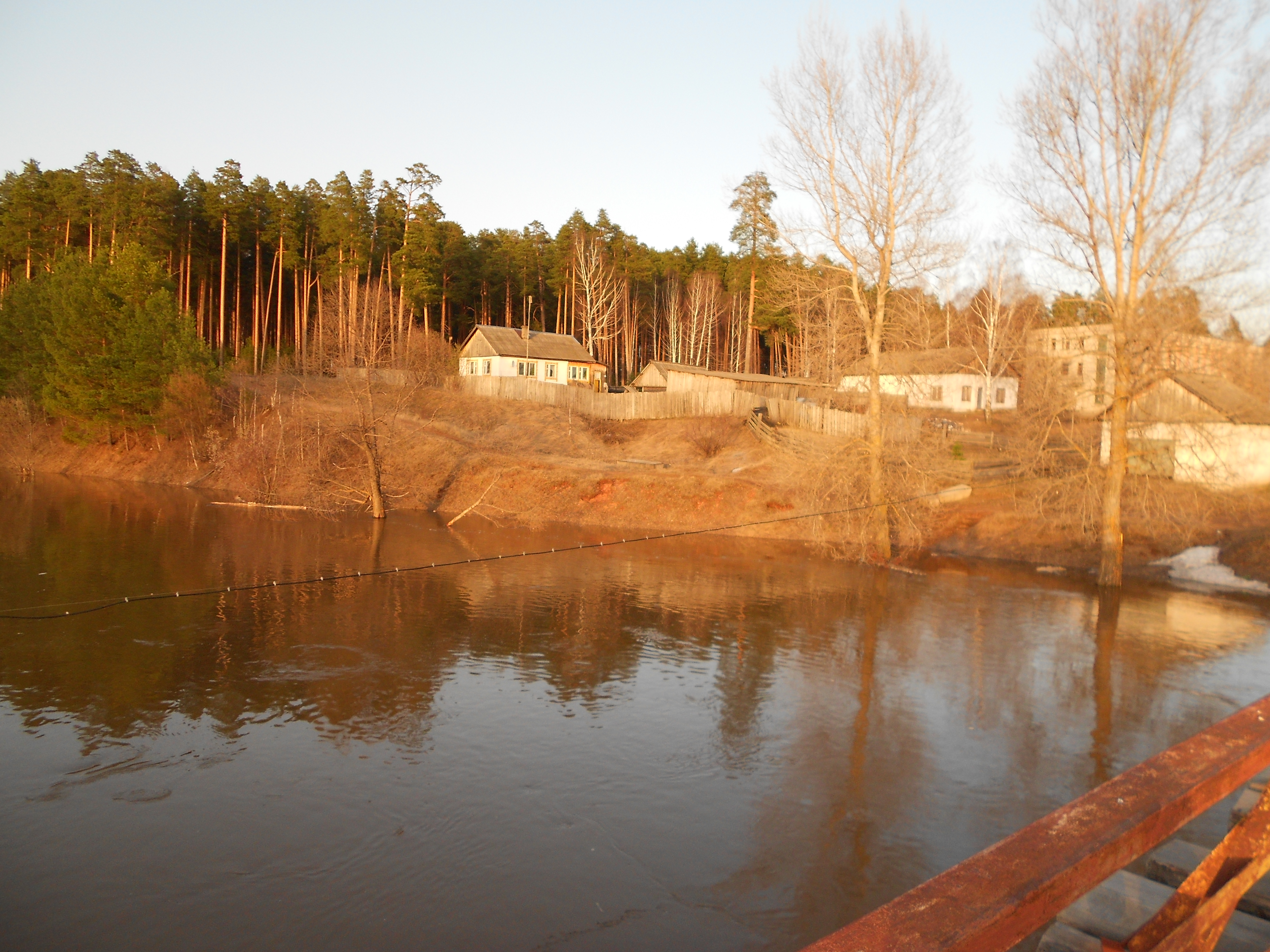
- Kilmezsky Park, Syumsinsky District

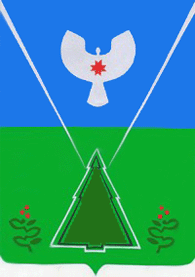
- Flag Coat of arms
- Location of Syumsinsky District in the Udmurt Republic
- Coordinates: 57.159°N 50.960°E
- Country: Russia
- Federal subject: Udmurt Republic
- Established: 15 July 1929
- Administrative center: Syumsi

Area
  - Total: 1,789.7 km^{2} (691.0 sq mi)

Population (2010 Census)
  - Total: 13,401
  - Density: 7.4878/km^{2} (19.393/sq mi)
  - Urban: 0%
  - Rural: 100%

Administrative structure
  - Administrative divisions: 8 selsoviet
  - Inhabited localities: 56 rural localities

Municipal structure
  - Municipally incorporated as: Syumsinsky Municipal District
  - Municipal divisions: 0 urban settlements, 8 rural settlements
- Time zone: UTC+4 (MSK+1)
- OKTMO ID: 94641000
- Website: http://sumsi-adm.ru/

Syumsinsky District (Russian: Сюмси́нский райо́н; Udmurt: Сюмси ёрос, Sjumsi joros) is an administrative and municipal district (raion), one of the twenty-five in the Udmurt Republic, Russia. It is located in the west of the republic. The area of the district is 1,789.7 kilometers (1,112.1 mi). Its administrative center is the rural locality (a selo) of Syumsi. Population: 13,401 (2010 census); 16,288 (2002 Census); 17,883 (1989 Soviet census). The population of Syumsi accounts for 39.7% of the district's total population.
