= Kiyasovo, Udmurt Republic =

Kiyasovo Киясово
- Selo
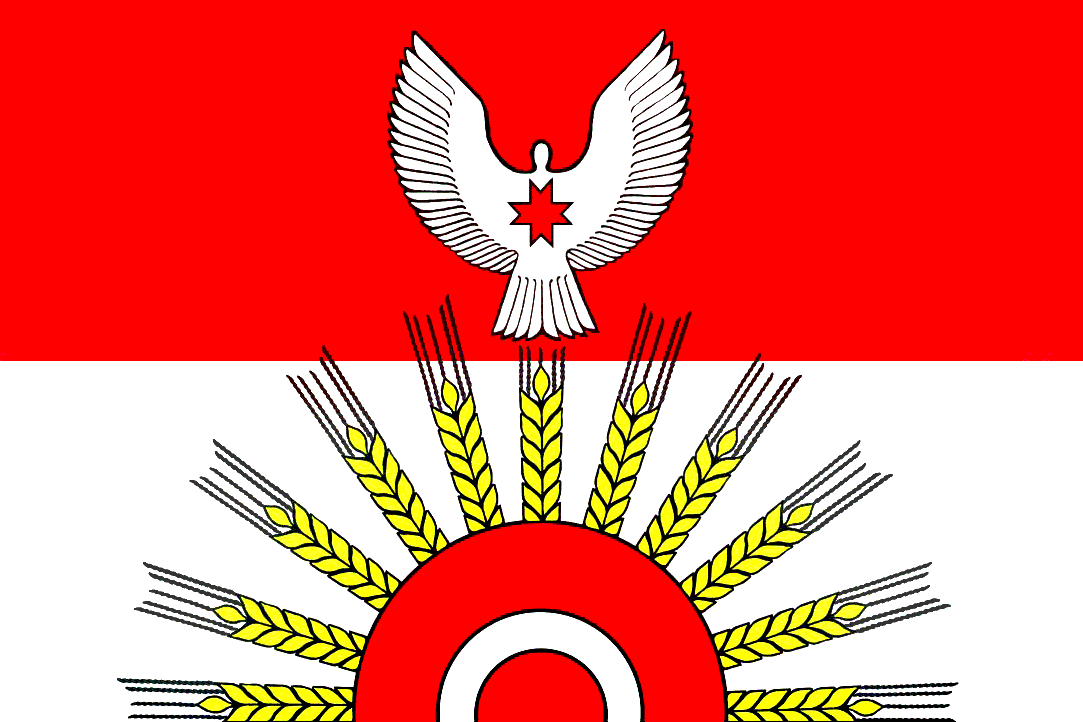
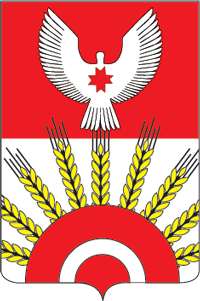
- Flag Coat of arms
- Interactive map of Kiyasovo
- Location of Kiyasovo Kiyasovo (Udmurt Republic)
- Coordinates: 56°20′38″N 53°07′21″E
- Country: Russia
- Federal subject: Udmurtia
- Administrative district: Kiyasovsky District
- Founded: 1710

Population (2010 Census)
  - Total: 3,207
  - Estimate (2021): 3,187 (−0.6%)

Administrative status
  - Capital of: Kiyasovsky District
- Time zone: UTC+4 (MSK+1)
- Postal code: 427840
- OKTMO ID: 94628444101

Kiyasovo (Russian: Кия́сово; Udmurt: Кияса, Kijasa) is a rural locality (a selo) and the administrative center of Kiyasovsky District of the Udmurt Republic, Russia. Population: 3,207 (2010 census); 3,302 (2002 census); 3,372 (1989 Soviet census).
