= Mozhga =

Town in the Udmurt Republic, Russia

Mozhga Можга
- Town

Other transcription(s)
  - Udmurt: Можга
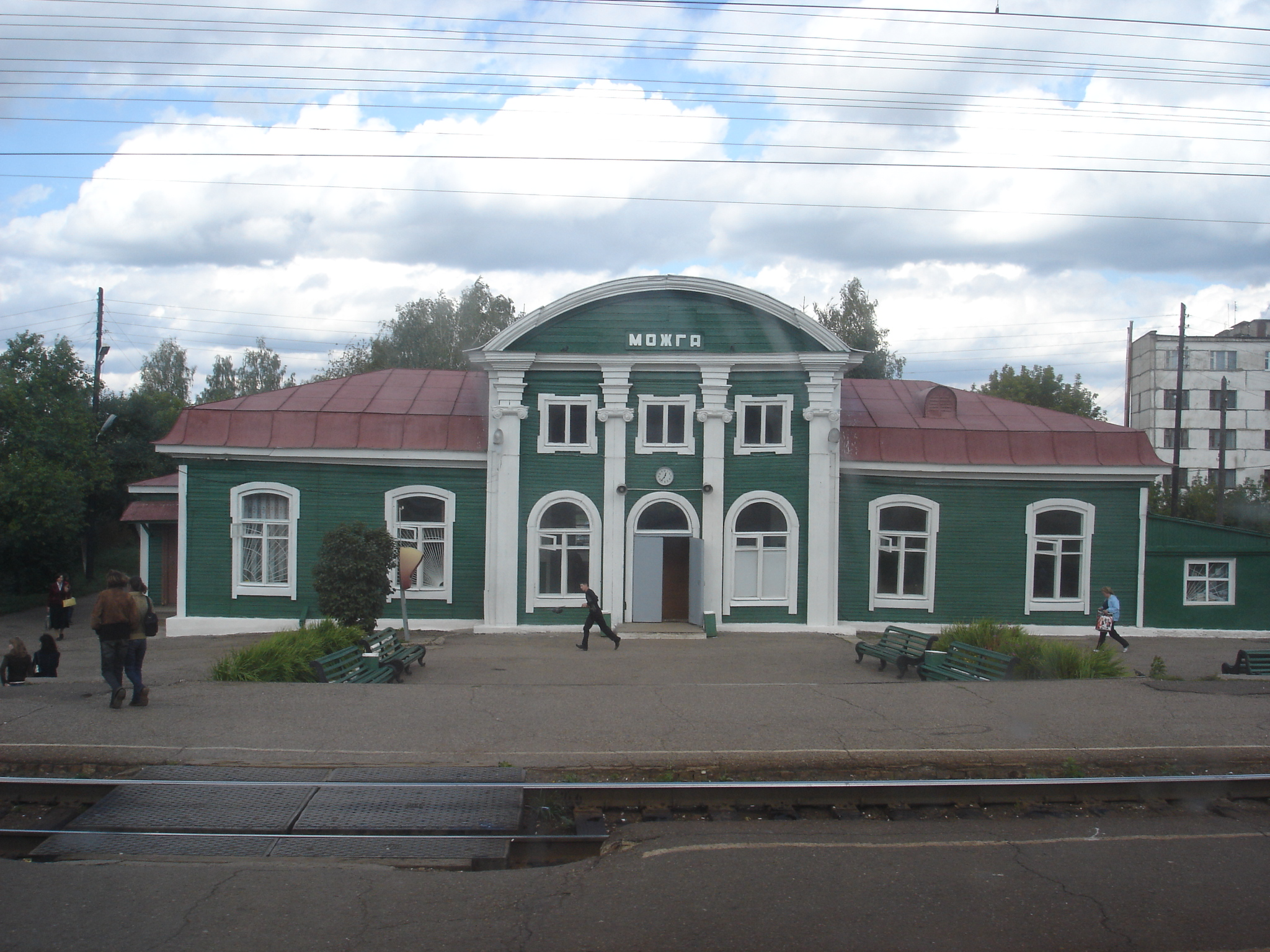
- Mozhga railway station building

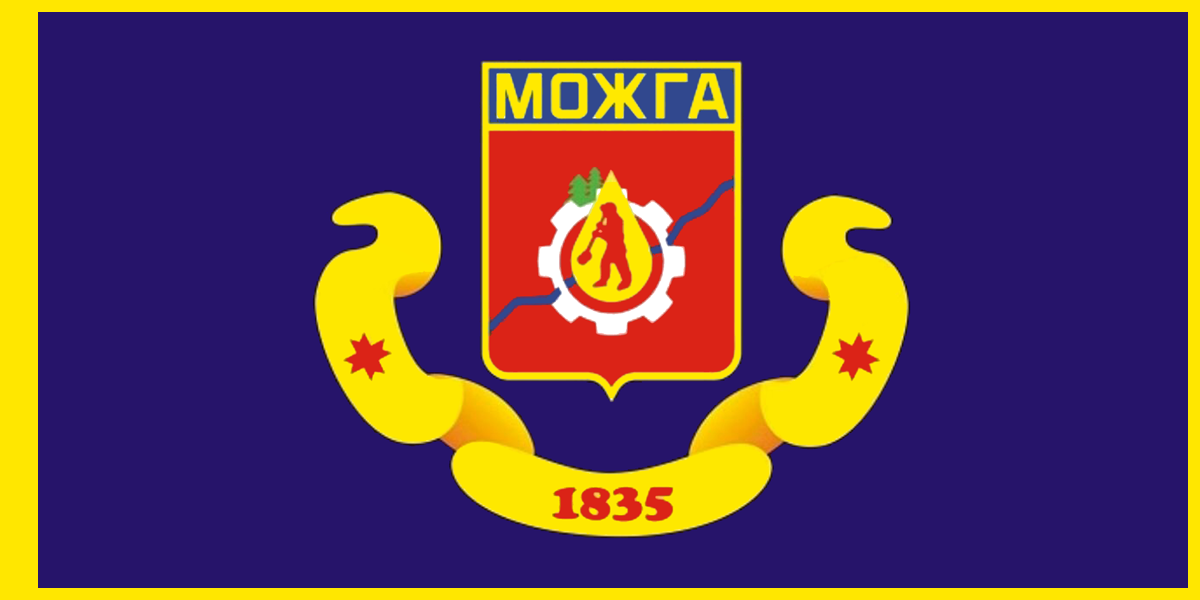
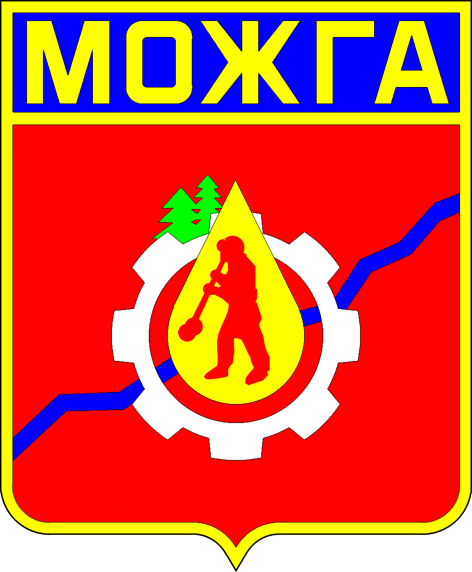
- Flag Coat of arms
- Interactive map of Mozhga
- Location of Mozhga Mozhga (Udmurt Republic)
- Coordinates: 56°27′N 52°13′E
- Country: Russia
- Federal subject: Udmurtia
- Founded: 1835
- Town status since: 1926

Government
  - Head: Sergey Pantyukhin
- Elevation: 150 m (490 ft)

Population (2010 Census)
  - Total: 47,961
  - Estimate (2025): 43,065 (−10.2%)

Administrative status
  - Subordinated to: town of republic significance of Mozhga
  - Capital of: Mozhginsky District, town of republic significance of Mozhga

Municipal status
  - Urban okrug: Mozhga Urban Okrug
  - Capital of: Mozhga Urban Okrug, Mozhginsky Municipal District
- Time zone: UTC+4 (MSK+1)
- Postal codes: 427789-427795, 427797, 427798
- Dialing code: +7 34139
- OKTMO ID: 94730000001
- Website: www.mozhga-gov.ru

Mozhga (Russian: Можга́; Udmurt: Можга, Možga) is a town in the Udmurt Republic, Russia, located at the confluence of the Syuga and Syugailka Rivers, 97 kilometers (60 mi) southwest of Izhevsk, the capital of the republic. Population: 47,961 (2010 census); 47,119 (2002 census); 46,049 (1989 Soviet census).

== History ==
It was founded in 1835 as a settlement around Syuginsky glass works. The works was built by the merchant Fyodor Chernov from Yelabuga and became known for the production of technical glass, jugs, and animal figurines. In 1916, Syuginskaya railway station was built near the factory settlement. After the October Revolution of 1917, it was renamed Sovetsky (Сове́тский), and later Krasny (Кра́сный). It was granted town status and given its present name in 1926.

== Administrative and municipal status ==
Within the framework of administrative divisions, Mozhga serves as the administrative center of Mozhginsky District, even though it is not a part of it. As an administrative division, it is incorporated separately as the town of republic significance of Mozhga—an administrative unit with the status equal to that of the districts. As a municipal division, the town of republic significance of Mozhga is incorporated as Mozhga Urban Okrug.

== Climate ==
Mozhga is within temperate continental climate, characterized by large annual range of temperatures; with hot summers and cold winters. Significant changes in temperature are normally observed during the day.

== Economy ==
Mozhga is an important industrial center of southwestern Udmurtia.

== Demographics ==
The ethnic makeup of the town is:

- Russians: 56.5%
- Udmurts: 25.8%
- Tatars: 15.6%
