= Yukamenskoye =

Rural locality in Udmurtia, Russia

Coordinates: 57°53′10.7″N 52°15′01.9″E

Yukamenskoye (Russian: Юкаменское, Udmurt: Юкаменск, Jukamensk) is a rural locality (a selo) and the administrative center of Yukamensky District, Udmurtia, Russia. Population: 4,104 (2010 census); 4,326 (2002 census); 4,623 (1989 Soviet census).
