= Kiyasovsky District =

Kiyasovsky District Киясовский район
- District

Other transcription(s)
  - Udmurt: Кияса ёрос
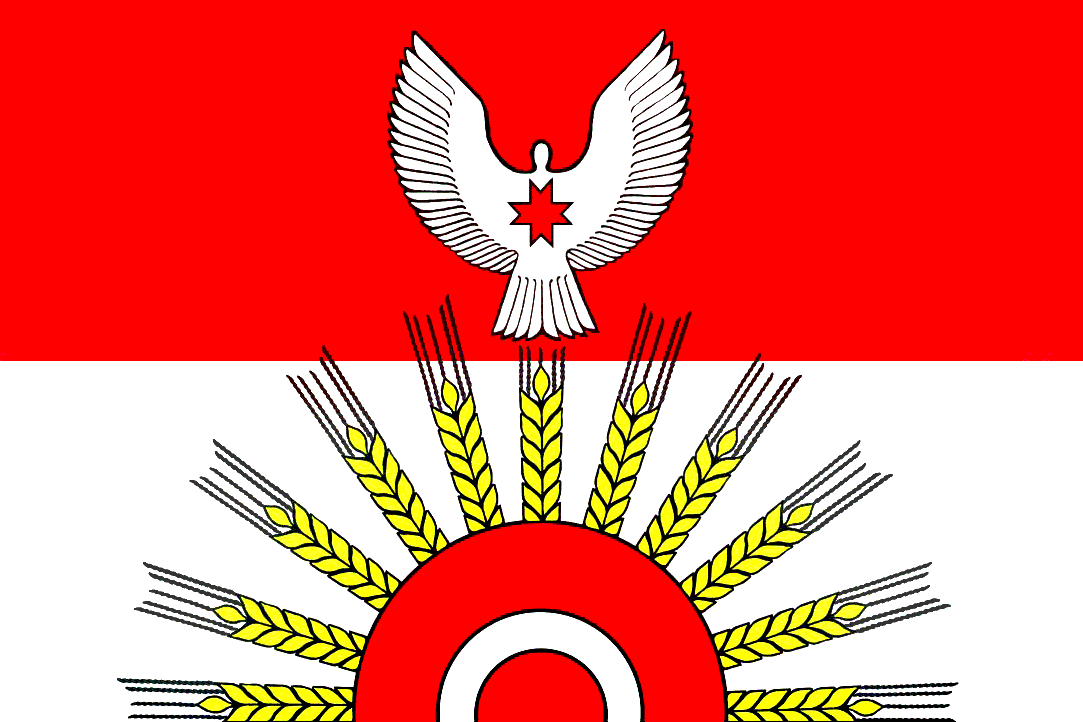
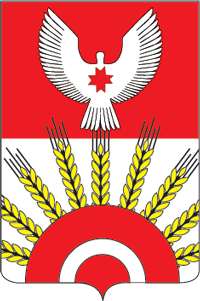
- Flag Coat of arms
- Location of Kiyasovsky District in the Udmurt Republic
- Coordinates: 56.277°N 52.907°E
- Country: Russia
- Federal subject: Udmurt Republic
- Established: 4 November 1926
- Administrative center: Kiyasovo

Area
  - Total: 821.3 km^{2} (317.1 sq mi)

Population (2010 Census)
  - Total: 10,305
  - Density: 12.55/km^{2} (32.50/sq mi)
  - Urban: 0%
  - Rural: 100%

Administrative structure
  - Administrative divisions: 8 selsoviet
  - Inhabited localities: 34 rural localities

Municipal structure
  - Municipally incorporated as: Kiyasovsky Municipal District
  - Municipal divisions: 0 urban settlements, 8 rural settlements
- Time zone: UTC+4 (MSK+1)
- OKTMO ID: 94628000
- Website: http://kiyasovo.udmurt.ru/

Kiyasovsky District (Russian: Кия́совский райо́н; Udmurt: Кияса ёрос, Kijasa joros) is an administrative and municipal district (raion), one of the twenty-five in the Udmurt Republic, Russia. It is located in the south of the republic. The area of the district is 821.3 square kilometers (317.1 sq mi). Its administrative center is the rural locality (a selo) of Kiyasovo. Population: 10,305 (2010 Census); 11,550 (2002 Census); 12,603 (1989 Soviet census). The population of Kiyasovo accounts for 31.1% of the district's total population.
