= Seltinsky District =

Seltinsky District Селтинский район (Russian)
- District

Other transcription(s)
  - Udmurt: Сьӧлта ёрос
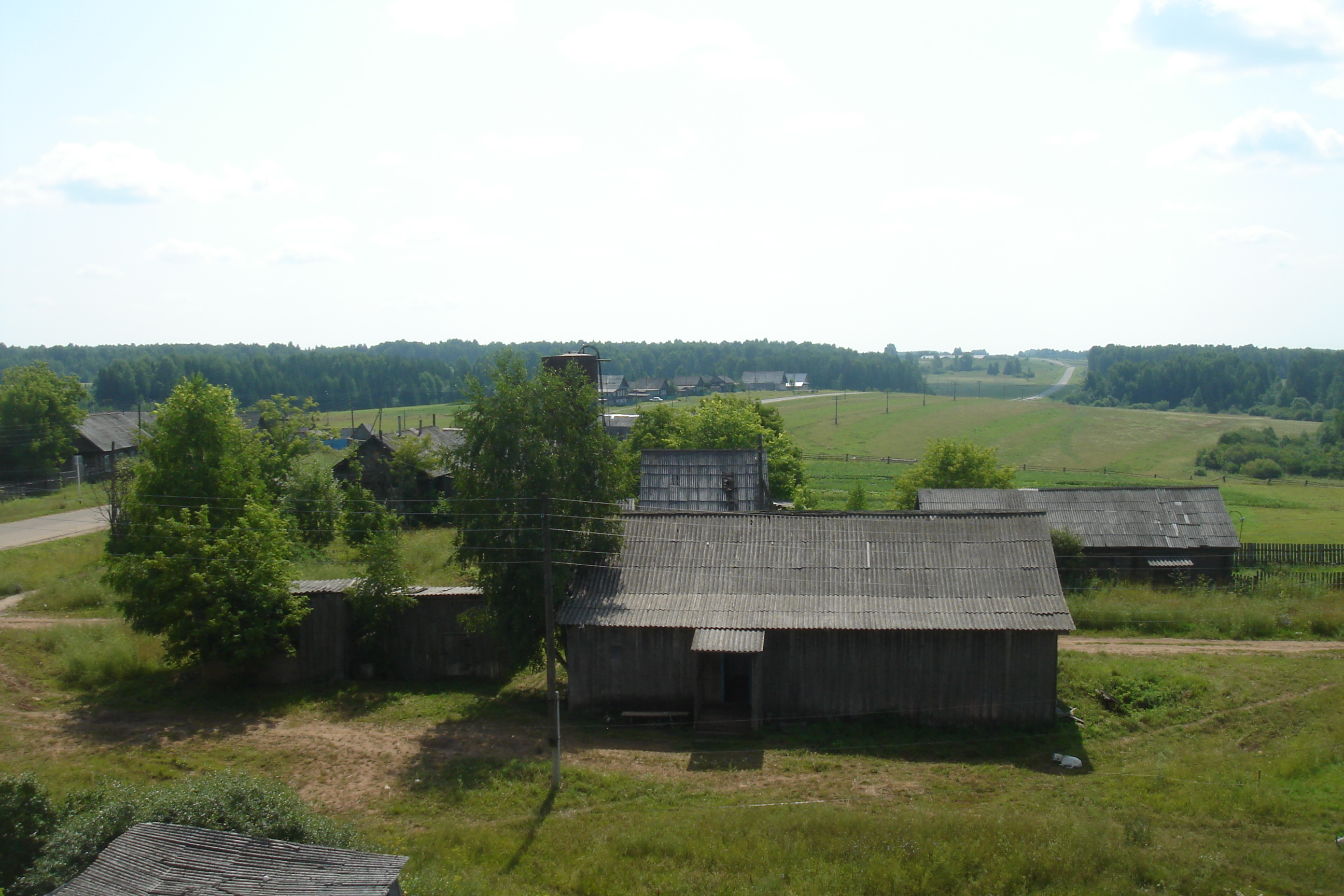
- View of the selo of Valamaz in Seltinsky District

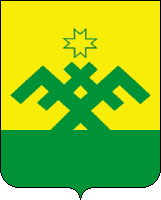
- Flag Coat of arms
- Location of Seltinsky District in the Udmurt Republic
- Coordinates: 57.351°N 51.726°E
- Country: Russia
- Federal subject: Udmurt Republic
- Established: 15 July 1929
- Administrative center: Selty

Area
  - Total: 1,883.7 km^{2} (727.3 sq mi)

Population (2010 Census)
  - Total: 11,368
  - Density: 6.0349/km^{2} (15.630/sq mi)
  - Urban: 0%
  - Rural: 100%

Administrative structure
  - Administrative divisions: 9 selsoviet
  - Inhabited localities: 72 rural localities

Municipal structure
  - Municipally incorporated as: Seltinsky Municipal District
  - Municipal divisions: 0 urban settlements, 9 rural settlements
- Time zone: UTC+4 (MSK+1)
- OKTMO ID: 94639000
- Website: http://selty.udmurt.ru/

Seltinsky District (Russian: Селти́нский райо́н; Udmurt: Сьӧлта ёрос, Śölta joros) is an administrative and municipal district (raion), one of the twenty-five in the Udmurt Republic, Russia. It is located in the west of the republic. The area of the district is 1,883.7 square kilometers (727.3 sq mi). Its administrative center is the rural locality (a selo) of Selty. Population: 11,368 (2010 census); 13,335 (2002 Census); 15,050 (1989 Soviet census). The population of Selty accounts for 46.4% of the district's total population.
