= Zavyalovsky District, Udmurtia =

Zavyalovsky District Завьяловский район (Russian)
- District

Other transcription(s)
  - Udmurt: Завьял ёрос
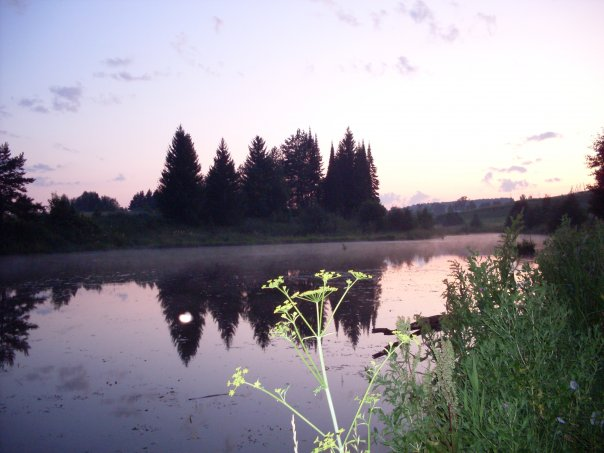
- A pond in the village of Kolyushevo in Zavyalovsky District

- Flag Coat of arms
- Location of Zavyalovsky District in the Udmurt Republic
- Coordinates: 56°47′25″N 53°22′50″E
- Country: Russia
- Federal subject: Udmurt Republic
- Established: 1 June 1937
- Administrative center: Zavyalovo

Area
  - Total: 2,203.3 km^{2} (850.7 sq mi)

Population (2010 Census)
  - Total: 66,000
  - Density: 30/km^{2} (78/sq mi)
  - Urban: 0%
  - Rural: 100%

Administrative structure
  - Administrative divisions: 19 selsoviet
  - Inhabited localities: 126 rural localities

Municipal structure
  - Municipally incorporated as: Zavyalovsky Municipal District
  - Municipal divisions: 0 urban settlements, 19 rural settlements
- Time zone: UTC+4 (MSK+1)
- OKTMO ID: 94616000
- Website: http://завьяловский.рф/

Zavyalovsky District (Russian: Завья́ловский райо́н; Udmurt: Завьял ёрос / Дэри ёрос, Zavjal joros / Deri joros) is an administrative and municipal district (raion), one of the twenty-five in the Udmurt Republic, Russia. It is located in the southern central part of the republic. The area of the district is 2,203.3 square kilometers (850.7 sq mi). Its administrative center is the rural locality (a selo) of Zavyalovo. Population: 66,000 (2010 census); 59,145 (2002 census); 53,388 (1989 Soviet census). The population of Zavyalovo accounts for 13.6% of the district's total population.
