= Kiznersky District =

Kiznersky District Кизнерский район (Russian)
- District

Other transcription(s)
  - Udmurt: Кизнер ёрос
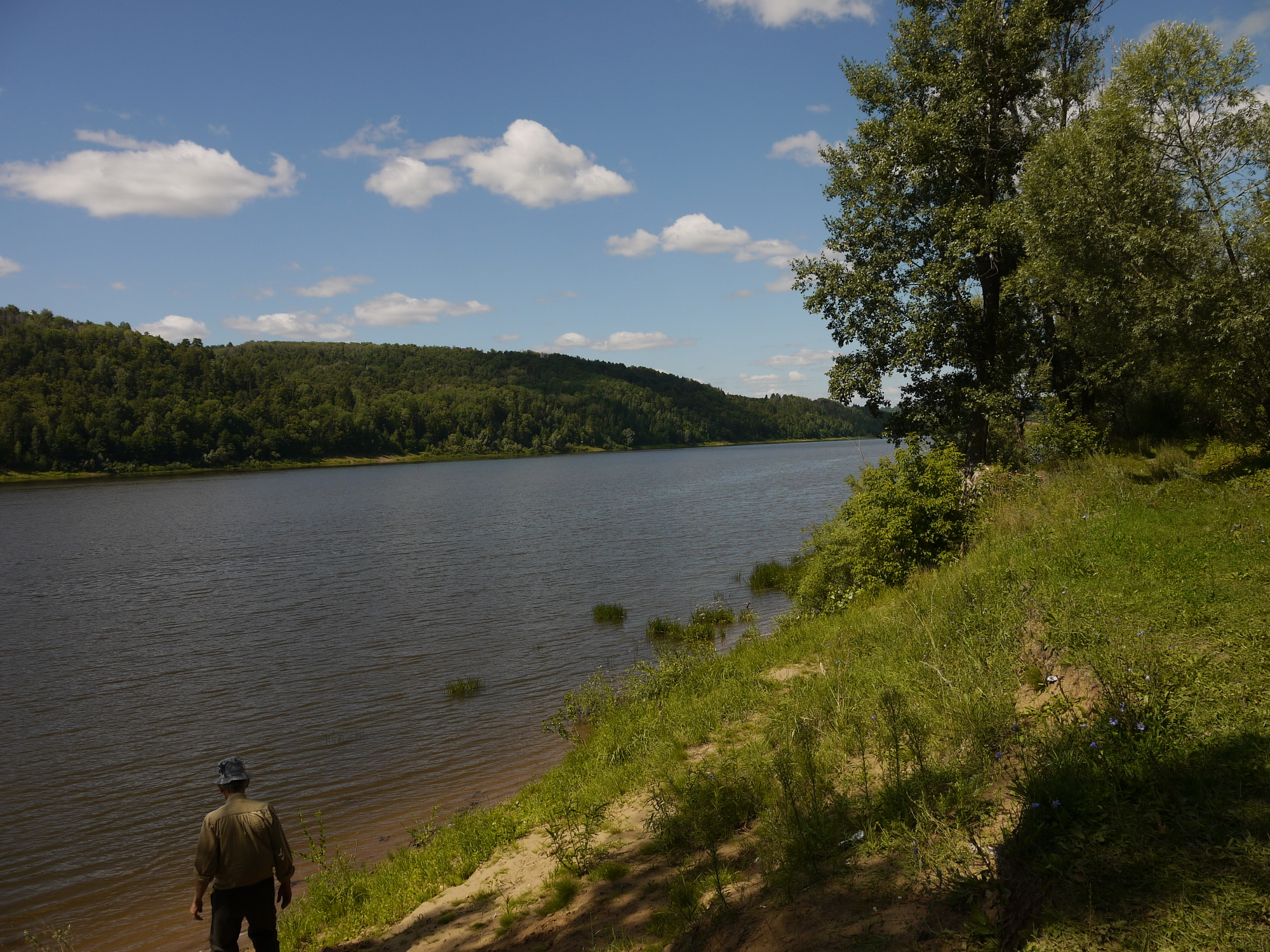
- Landscape in Kiznersky District

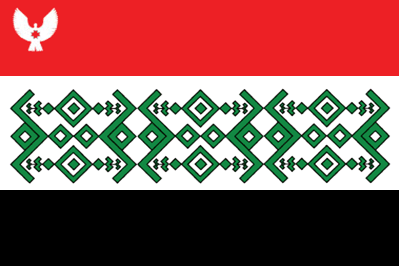
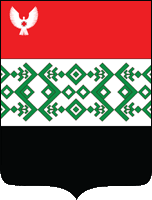
- Flag Coat of arms
- Location of Kiznersky District in the Udmurt Republic
- Coordinates: 56.300°N 51.012°E
- Country: Russia
- Federal subject: Udmurt Republic
- Established: 24 January 1939
- Administrative center: Kizner

Area
  - Total: 2,131.1 km^{2} (822.8 sq mi)

Population (2010 Census)
  - Total: 20,263
  - Density: 9.5082/km^{2} (24.626/sq mi)
  - Urban: 0%
  - Rural: 100%

Administrative structure
  - Administrative divisions: 17 selsoviet
  - Inhabited localities: 74 rural localities

Municipal structure
  - Municipally incorporated as: Kiznersky Municipal District
  - Municipal divisions: 0 urban settlements, 14 rural settlements
- Time zone: UTC+4 (MSK+1)
- OKTMO ID: 94626000
- Website: http://mykizner.ru/

Kiznersky District (Russian: Кизне́рский райо́н; Udmurt: Кизнер ёрос, Kizner joros) is an administrative and municipal district (raion), one of the twenty-five in the Udmurt Republic, Russia. It is located in the southwest of the republic. The area of the district is 2,131.1 square kilometers (822.8 sq mi). Its administrative center is the rural locality (a settlement) of Kizner. Population: 20,263 (2010 census); 23,502 (2002 Census); 25,991 (1989 Soviet census). The population of Kizner accounts for 47.1% of the district's total population.

== Geography ==
Major rivers in the district include the Vyatka, the Kazanka, the Pyzhmanka, the Lyuga, and the Umyak.

== Demographics ==
Ethnic composition (according to the 2002 Census):

- Udmurts: 46%
- Russians: 44.8%
- Tatars: 6.8%

== Economy ==
District's economy is based on agriculture.
