= Krasnogorsky District, Udmurtia =

Krasnogorsky District Красногорский район (Russian)
- District

Other transcription(s)
  - Udmurt: Красногорск ёрос
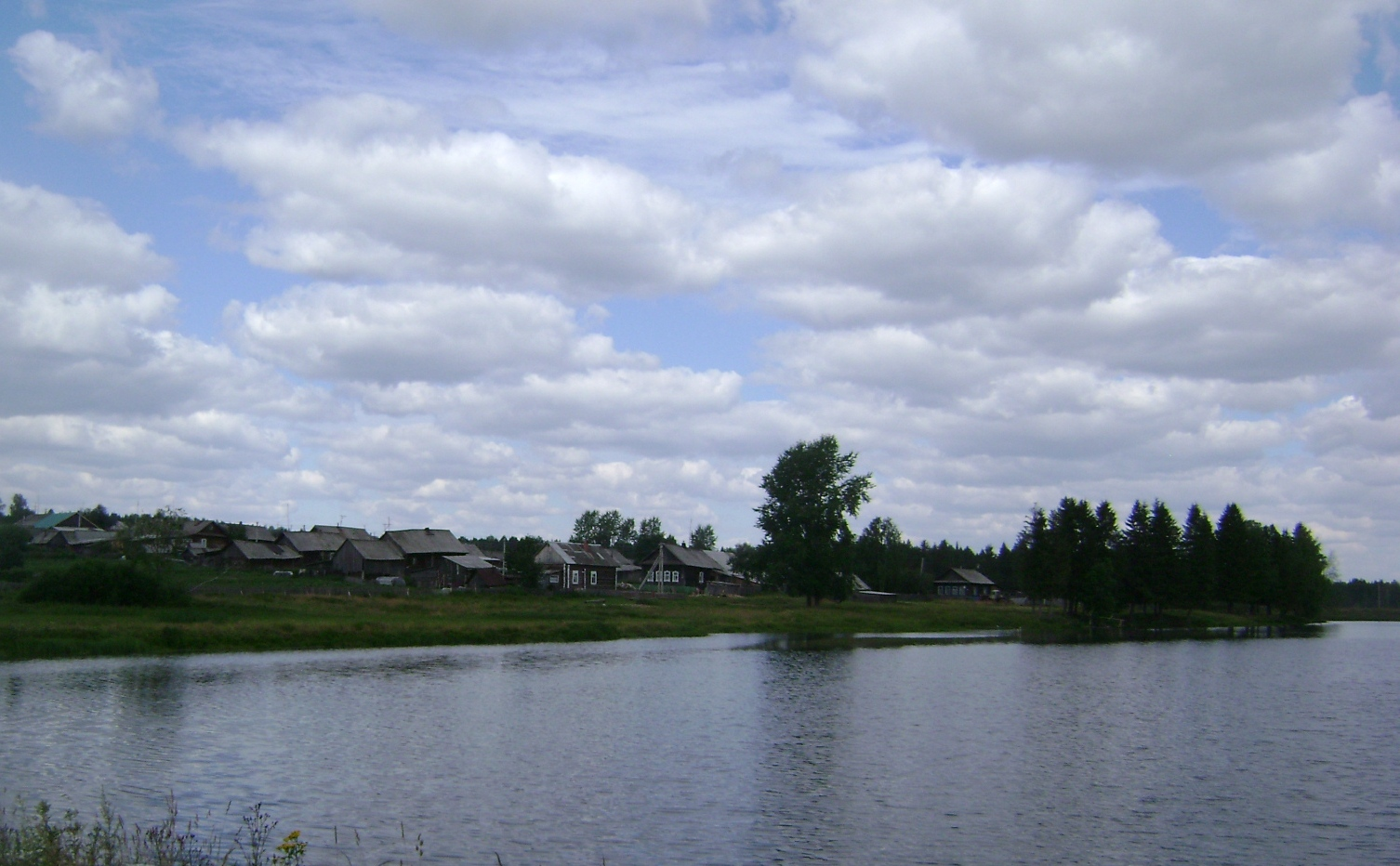
- A pond in the selo of Krasnogorskoye, the administrative center of Krasnogorsky District

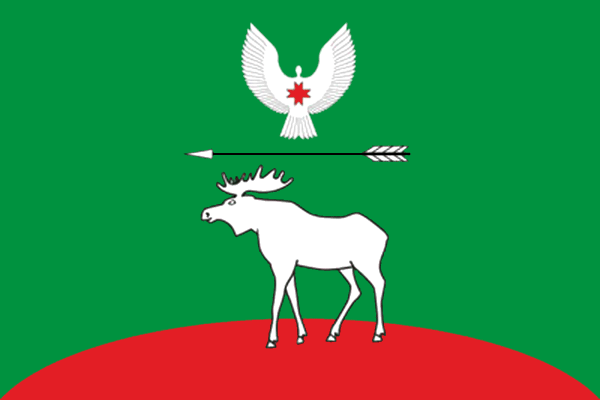
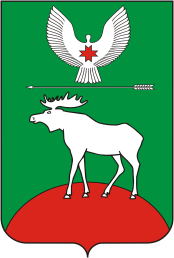
- Flag Coat of arms
- Location of Krasnogorsky District in the Udmurt Republic
- Coordinates: 57°42′25″N 52°29′49″E
- Country: Russia
- Federal subject: Udmurt Republic
- Established: 15 July 1929
- Administrative center: Krasnogorskoye

Area
  - Total: 1,860.1 km^{2} (718.2 sq mi)

Population (2010 Census)
  - Total: 10,347
  - Density: 5.5626/km^{2} (14.407/sq mi)
  - Urban: 0%
  - Rural: 100%

Administrative structure
  - Administrative divisions: 10 selsoviet
  - Inhabited localities: 71 rural localities

Municipal structure
  - Municipally incorporated as: Krasnogorsky Municipal District
  - Municipal divisions: 0 urban settlements, 10 rural settlements
- Time zone: UTC+4 (MSK+1)
- OKTMO ID: 94530000
- Website: http://mo-krasno.ru/

Krasnogorsky District (Russian: Красного́рский райо́н; Udmurt: Красногорск ёрос, Krasnogorsk joros) is an administrative and municipal district (raion), one of the twenty-five in the Udmurt Republic, Russia. It is located in the northwest of the republic. The area of the district is 1,860.1 square kilometers (718.2 sq mi). Its administrative center is the rural locality (a selo) of Krasnogorskoye. Population: 10,347 (2010 census); 12,219 (2002 Census); 14,202 (1989 Soviet census). The population of Krasnogorskoye accounts for 42.8% of the district's total population.
