= Kezsky District =

Kezsky District Кезский район (Russian)
- District

Other transcription(s)
  - Udmurt: Кез ёрос
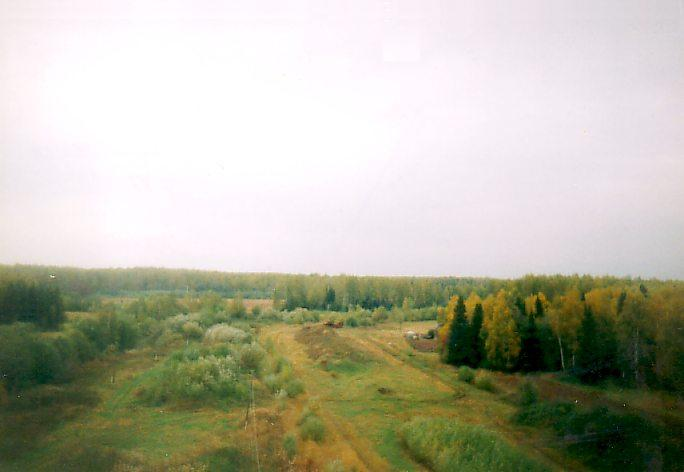
- Polomsky Narrow-gauge railway, Kezsky District

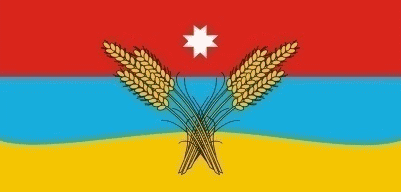
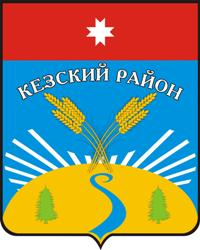
- Flag Coat of arms
- Location of Kezsky District in the Udmurt Republic
- Coordinates: 58.074°N 53.161°E
- Country: Russia
- Federal subject: Udmurt Republic
- Established: 15 July 1929
- Administrative center: Kez

Area
  - Total: 2,321 km^{2} (896 sq mi)

Population (2010 Census)
  - Total: 22,911
  - Density: 9.871/km^{2} (25.57/sq mi)
  - Urban: 0%
  - Rural: 100%

Administrative structure
  - Administrative divisions: 15 selsoviet
  - Inhabited localities: 136 rural localities

Municipal structure
  - Municipally incorporated as: Kezsky Municipal District
  - Municipal divisions: 0 urban settlements, 15 rural settlements
- Time zone: UTC+4 (MSK+1)
- OKTMO ID: 94524000
- Website: http://kez.udmurt.ru/

Kezsky District (Russian: Ке́зский райо́н; Udmurt: Кез ёрос, Kez joros) is an administrative and municipal district (raion), one of the twenty-five in the Udmurt Republic, Russia. It is located in the northeast of the republic. The area of the district is 2,321 square kilometers (896 sq mi). Its administrative center is the rural locality (a settlement) of Kez. Population: 22,911 (2010 census); 26,446 (2002 Census); 29,264 (1989 Soviet census). The population of Kez accounts for 48.4% of the district's total population.

== Geography ==
The source of the Kama River is located in the district. Other rivers of note include the Lyp, the Pyzep, and others.

== Demographics ==
Ethnic composition:

- Udmurts: 68%
- Russians: 30%
- Tatars: 1%
