= Yukamensky District =

Yukamensky District Юкаменский район
- District

Other transcription(s)
  - Udmurt: Юкаменск ёрос
- Flag Coat of arms
- Location of Yukamensky District in the Udmurt Republic
- Coordinates: 57.931°N 51.922°E
- Country: Russia
- Federal subject: Udmurt Republic
- Established: 15 July 1929
- Administrative center: Yukamenskoye

Area
  - Total: 1,019.7 km^{2} (393.7 sq mi)

Population (2010 Census)
  - Total: 10,207
  - Density: 10.010/km^{2} (25.925/sq mi)
  - Urban: 0%
  - Rural: 100%

Administrative structure
  - Administrative divisions: 8 selsoviet
  - Inhabited localities: 73 rural localities

Municipal structure
  - Municipally incorporated as: Yukamensky Municipal District
  - Municipal divisions: 0 urban settlements, 8 rural settlements
- Time zone: UTC+4 (MSK+1)
- OKTMO ID: 94648000
- Website: http://yukamensk.udmurt.ru/

Yukamensky District (Russian: Юка́менский райо́н; Udmurt: Юкаменск ёрос, Jukamensk joros) is an administrative and municipal district (raion), one of the twenty-five in the Udmurt Republic, Russia. It is located in the northwest of the republic. The area of the district is 1,019.7 square kilometers (393.7 sq mi). Its administrative center is the rural locality (a selo) of Yukamenskoye. Population: 10,207 (2010 Census); 11,947 (2002 Census); 13,172 (1989 Soviet census). The population of Yukamenskoye accounts for 40.2% of the district's total population.
