= Izhevsk constituency =

Russian legislative constituency

Izhevsk single-member constituency
- Constituency of the Russian State Duma

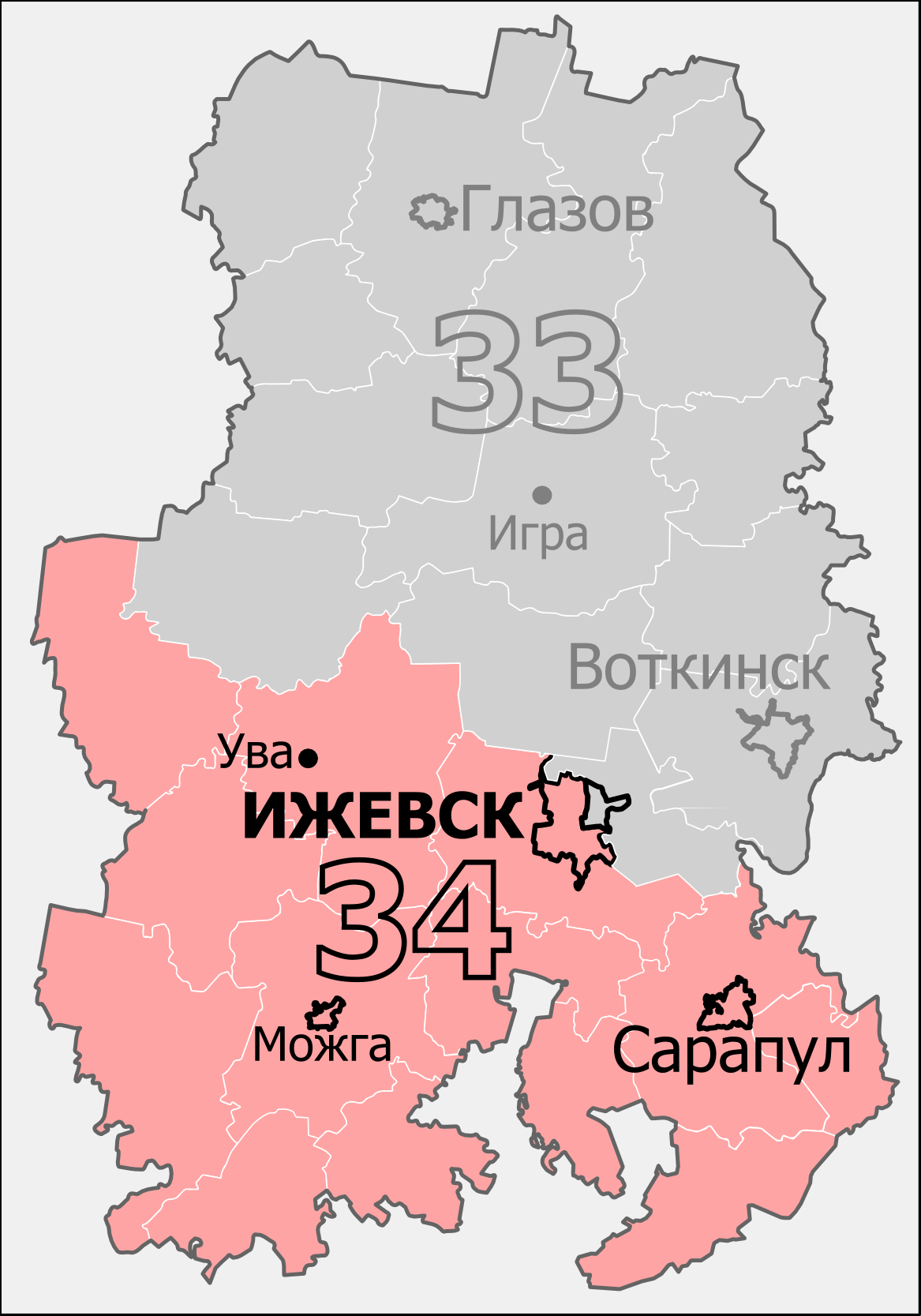
- Constituency boundaries since 2016
- Deputy: Oleg Garin; United Russia
- Federal subject: Udmurt Republic
- Districts: Alnashsky, Grakhovsky, Izhevsk (Oktyabrsky, Pervomaysky), Kambarsky, Karakulinsky, Kiyasovsky, Kiznersky, Malopurginsky, Mozhga, Mozhginsky, Sarapul, Sarapulsky, Syumsinsky, Uvinsky, Vavozhsky, Zavyalovsky (Babinskoye, Kamenskoye, Kiyakinskoye, Lyukskoye, Pirogovskoye, Podshivalovskoye, Shaberdinskoye, Sovkhoznoye, Srednepostolskoye, Varaksinskoye)
- Voters: 598,826 (2026)

The Izhevsk constituency (No.39 (Note: No.29 in 1993-1995 and 2003-2007, No.28 in 1995-2003, No.34 in 2016–2026)) is a Russian legislative constituency in Udmurtia. The constituency covers most of Izhevsk and southern Udmurtia.

The constituency has been represented since 2021 by United Russia deputy Oleg Garin, former Izhevsk City Duma chairman, who won the open seat, succeeding one-term United Russia incumbent Valery Buzilov.

== Boundaries ==
1993–2007: Izhevsk, Votkinsk, Votkinsky District, Zavyalovsky District
The constituency was primarily urban, covering the republican capital of Izhevsk, industrial town of Votkinsk and surrounding area.

2016–present: Alnashsky District, Grakhovsky District, Izhevsk (Oktyabrsky, Pervomaysky), Kambarsky District, Karakulinsky District, Kiyasovsky District, Kiznersky District, Malopurginsky District, Mozhga, Mozhginsky District, Sarapul, Sarapulsky District, Syumsinsky District, Uvinsky District, Vavozhsky District, Zavyalovsky District (Babinskoye, Kamenskoye, Kiyakinskoye, Lyukskoye, Pirogovskoye, Podshivalovskoye, Shaberdinskoye, Sovkhoznoye, Srednepostolskoye, Varaksinskoye)
The constituency was re-created for the 2016 election. This seat retained only most of Izhevsk and southern and western Zavyalovsky District, shedding the rest to Udmurtia constituency. The constituency gained southern Udmurtia, including the towns of Mozhga and Sarapul from Udmurtia constituency.

== Members elected ==
Election	Member	Party
1993	Aleksey Krasnykh	Party of Russian Unity and Accord
1995	Andrey Soluyanov	Independent
1999	Yury Maslyukov	Independent
2003	Yevgeny Bogomolny	United Russia
2007	Proportional representation - no election by constituency	
2011	Proportional representation - no election by constituency	
2016	Valery Buzilov	United Russia
2021	Oleg Garin	United Russia
2026	Oleg Garin	United Russia

== Election results ==
=== 1993 ===
==== Declared candidates ====
- Nikolay Baranov (Independent), Judge of the Supreme Court of Udmurtia (1987–present)
- Aleksey Krasnykh (PRES), Member of Supreme Council of Udmurtia (1990–present), Izhevsk Radio Plant automatic control services chief engineer
- Yevgeny Zaytsev (Independent), journalist

==== Results ====
Summary of the 12 December 1993 Russian legislative election in the Izhevsk constituency
Candidate	Party	Votes	%
Aleksey Krasnykh	Party of Russian Unity and Accord	48,846	19.80%
Nikolay Baranov	Independent	–	–
Yevgeny Zaytsev	Independent	–	–
Total		246,756	100%

=== 1995 ===
==== Declared candidates ====
- Dmitry Glavatskikh (V–N!), former First Secretary of the VLKSM Udmurt Oblast Committee (1987–1990)
- Olga Gurina (Common Cause), histology professor
- Galina Klimantova (Women of Russia), Member of State Duma (1994–present), Chairwoman of the Duma Committee on Women, Family, and Youth (1994–present)
- Mikhail Kokorin (Independent), Member of State Council of the Udmurt Republic (1995–present), attorney
- Aleksey Krasnykh (BIR), incumbent Member of State Duma (1994–present), Member of State Council of the Udmurt Republic (1995–present) (Note: was elected to the State Council of the Udmurt Republic in March 1995 in violation of the federal law)
- Natalya Kuznetsova (Independent), Deputy Minister of Social Protection of Udmurtia (1988–present)
- Ildar Mavlutdinov (Independent), militsiya officer
- Sergey Molchanov (KRO), businessman
- Vladimir Podoprigora (Independent), Member of Federation Council (1994–present), Chairman of the Council Committee on International Affairs (1994–present)
- Galina Repina (CPRF), former First Secretary of the VLKSM Udmurt Oblast Committee (1983–1985)
- Vitaly Skrynnik (DVR–OD), former Member of Supreme Council of Udmurtia (1990–1995), philosophy professor
- Andrey Soluyanov (Independent), Member of State Council of the Udmurt Republic (1995–present), construction businessman

==== Results ====
Summary of the 17 December 1995 Russian legislative election in the Izhevsk constituency
Candidate	Party	Votes	%
Andrey Soluyanov	Independent	51,180	15.60%
Vladimir Podoprigora	Independent	47,603	14.51%
Galina Repina	Communist Party	40,777	12.43%
Natalya Kuznetsova	Independent	37,273	11.36%
Galina Klimantova	Women of Russia	33,244	10.13%
Sergey Molchanov	Congress of Russian Communities	23,095	7.04%
Vitaly Skrynnik	Democratic Choice of Russia – United Democrats	22,387	6.82%
Mikhail Kokorin	Independent	14,672	4.47%
Ildar Mavlutdinov	Independent	9,957	3.03%
Aleksey Krasnykh (incumbent)	Ivan Rybkin Bloc	8,211	2.50%
Olga Gurina	Common Cause	7,557	2.30%
Dmitry Glavatskikh	Power to the People	2,244	0.68%
against all		22,550	6.87%
Total		328,134	100%

=== 1999 ===
==== Declared candidates ====
- Vladimir Alekseyev (Kedr), physics lab head
- Anatoly Baranov (Independent), journalist
- Nikolay Baranov (KTR–zSS), Judge of the Supreme Court of Udmurtia (1987–present), 1993 candidate for this seat
- Sergey Baranov (Independent), nonprofit staffer
- Olga Gurina (Women of Russia), histology professor, 1995 Common Cause candidate for this seat
- Nikolay Makarov (Nikolayev–Fyodorov Bloc), medical centre director
- Yury Maslyukov (Independent), former First Deputy Prime Minister of Russia (1998–1999), former Member of State Duma (1996–1998)
- Irina Sinitsyna (DN), rector of Ural International Engineering University (1995–present)
- Vitaly Solovyov (Independent), Member of State Council of the Udmurt Republic (1995–present), former People's Deputy of Russia (1990–1993)
- Andrey Soluyanov (Independent), incumbent Member of State Duma (1996–present)
- Vladimir Syamin (Independent), corporate executive
- Lyudmila Yairova (NDR), Russian State Circus Company president
- Vladimir Zabilsky (Unity), Member of State Council of the Udmurt Republic (1999–present), technical leading researcher

==== Withdrawn candidates ====
- Igor Chuykov (Independent), youth club director

==== Failed to qualify ====
- Sergey Berkutov (Independent), Member of State Council of the Udmurt Republic (1999–present), attorney

==== Did not file ====
- Sergey Ryabov (Independent)
- Nikolay Sekerin (Independent)
- Ramil Shamatov (Independent)

==== Results ====
Summary of the 19 December 1999 Russian legislative election in the Izhevsk constituency
Candidate	Party	Votes	%
Yury Maslyukov	Independent	84,323	22.36%
Andrey Soluyanov (incumbent)	Independent	76,641	20.32%
Vladimir Zabilsky	Unity	55,102	14.61%
Vitaly Solovyov	Independent	23,125	6.13%
Nikolay Baranov	Communists and Workers of Russia - for the Soviet Union	23,095	6.12%
Olga Gurina	Women of Russia	22,882	6.07%
Lyudmila Yairova	Our Home – Russia	15,066	3.99%
Irina Sinitsyna	Spiritual Heritage	6,305	1.67%
Vladimir Alekseyev	Kedr	5,885	1.56%
Nikolay Makarov	Andrey Nikolayev and Svyatoslav Fyodorov Bloc	3,831	1.02%
Sergey Baranov	Independent	3,562	0.94%
Vladimir Syamin	Independent	3,553	0.94%
Anatoly Baranov	Independent	1,030	0.27%
against all		44,899	11.90%
Total		377,164	100%

=== 2003 ===
==== Declared candidates ====
- Andrey Andreyev (CPRF), Member of State Council of the Udmurt Republic (2003–present), press secretary of the CPRF faction in the State Duma (1997–present)
- Anatoly Arefyev (PVR-RPZh), chairman of the PVR regional executive committee
- Yevgeny Bogomolny (United Russia), Member of State Council of the Udmurt Republic (1999–present), oil executive
- Yevgeny Kulagin (Independent), insurance agent
- Sergey Shuklin (SDPR), Head of the Federal Service for Financial Recovery and Bankruptcy Regional Office, 2000 presidential candidate
- Dmitry Shumkov (SPS), businessman, investor
- Viktor Yevdokimov (LDPR), businessman
- Vladimir Zabilsky (Independent), former Member of State Council of the Udmurt Republic (1999–2003), technical leading researcher, 1999 candidate for this seat, 2000 presidential candidate (previously ran as Yabloko candidate)

==== Did not file ====
- Marina Kostyleva (ORP Rus'), document specialist

==== Declined ====
- Yury Maslyukov (CPRF), incumbent Member of State Duma (1996–1998, 200–present), former Chairman of the Duma Committee on Industry, Construction, and Scientific Technology (2000–2002) (ran on the party list)

==== Results ====
Summary of the 7 December 2003 Russian legislative election in the Izhevsk constituency
Candidate	Party	Votes	%
Yevgeny Bogomolny	United Russia	110,679	32.12%
Andrey Andreyev	Communist Party	52,897	15.35%
Dmitry Shumkov	Union of Right Forces	47,716	13.85%
Sergey Shuklin	Social Democratic Party	20,074	5.83%
Vladimir Zabilsky	Independent	16,455	4.78%
Viktor Yevdokimov	Liberal Democratic Party	15,867	4.60%
Anatoly Arefyev	Party of Russia's Rebirth-Russian Party of Life	6,283	1.82%
Yevgeny Kulagin	Independent	2,779	0.81%
against all		64,909	18.84%
Total		344,843	100%

=== 2016 ===
==== Declared candidates ====
- Vladimir Bodrov (CPRF), Member of State Council of the Udmurt Republic (2007–present), aide to State Duma member Nikolay Sapozhnikov
- Valery Buzilov (United Russia), Member of State Council of the Udmurt Republic (1999–present)
- Anton Gusev (LDPR), Member of Votkinsk City Duma (2015–present), corporate executive
- Yury Mishkin (CPCR), perennial candidate
- Mikhail Nazarov (Yabloko), utilities businessman
- Ruslan Timurshin (PARNAS), chairman of the party regional office
- Farid Yunusov (A Just Russia), Member of State Council of the Udmurt Republic (2012–present), rector of Russian Academy of Medical-Social Rehabilitation

==== Failed to qualify ====
- Oleg Ovchinnikov (Independent), unemployed, United Russia primary candidate

==== Declined ====
- Galina Merzlyakova (United Russia), rector of Udmurt State University (2012–present), former Member of State Council of the Udmurt Republic (2003–2012) (lost the primary)

==== Results ====
Summary of the 18 September 2016 Russian legislative election in the Izhevsk constituency
Candidate	Party	Votes	%
Valery Buzilov	United Russia	138,675	50.85%
Vladimir Bodrov	Communist Party	42,519	15.59%
Farid Yunusov	A Just Russia	36,293	13.31%
Anton Gusev	Liberal Democratic Party	27,789	10.19%
Yury Mishkin	Communists of Russia	8,316	3.05%
Mikhail Nazarov	Yabloko	5,241	1.92%
Ruslan Timurshin	People's Freedom Party	4,340	1.59%
Total		272,707	100%

=== 2021 ===
==== Declared candidates ====
- Roza Akhmedshina (ZA!), lawyer
- Pavel Belinov (Rodina), Member of Mozhga City Duma (2020–present), businessman
- Vladimir Bodrov (CPRF), Member of State Council of the Udmurt Republic (2007–present), 2016 candidate for this seat, 2017 head candidate
- Iya Boronina (Yabloko), chairwoman of the party regional office
- Sergey Chudayev (New People), secretary of the party regional office
- Oleg Garin (United Russia), Deputy Chairman of the Izhevsk City Duma (2020–present), former Chairman of the City Duma (2015–2020)
- Yury Mishkin (CPCR), perennial candidate, 2016 candidate for this seat
- Aleksandr Tugulev (RPPSS), former Member of Alnashsky District Council (2011–2016), perennial candidate
- Timur Yagafarov (LDPR), Member of State Council of the Udmurt Republic (2012–present), engineer, 2017 head candidate
- Askold Zapashny (SR–ZP), artistic director of the Moscow State Circus (2012–present)
- Sergey Zaychikov (GP), former Member of Izhevsk City Duma (2005–2010), businessman

==== Failed to qualify ====
- Andrey Kosolapov (Independent), attorney

==== Declined ====
- Valery Buzilov (United Russia), incumbent Member of State Duma (2016–present) (ran for Kiyasovsky District Council)

==== Results ====
Summary of the 17-19 September 2021 Russian legislative election in the Izhevsk constituency
Candidate	Party	Votes	%
Oleg Garin	United Russia	93,607	33.36%
Vladimir Bodrov	Communist Party	61,164	21.80%
Askold Zapashny	A Just Russia — For Truth	28,722	10.23%
Timur Yagafarov	Liberal Democratic Party	16,591	5.91%
Aleksandr Tugulev	Party of Pensioners	14,211	5.06%
Sergey Chudayev	New People	12,677	4.52%
Yury Mishkin	Communists of Russia	11,280	4.02%
Roza Akhmedshina	Green Alternative	10,625	3.79%
Pavel Belinov	Rodina	8,528	3.04%
Iya Boronina	Yabloko	7,011	2.50%
Sergey Zaychikov	Civic Platform	3,390	1.21%
Total		280,627	100%

=== 2026 ===
==== Declared candidates ====
- Yury Balakhontsev (CPRF), Member of State Council of the Udmurt Republic (2022–present), industrial executive
- Konstantin Buzanov (RPPSS), chairman of the party regional office
- Oleg Garin (United Russia), incumbent Member of State Duma (2021–present)
- Anton Golovkov (A Just Russia), Member of Izhevsk City Duma (2025–present), leasing executive
- Yulia Sadykova (Rodina), quality engineer
- Andrey Saltykov (The Greens), businessman
- Stanislav Shestakov (New People), former Head of the Izhevsk Department of Public Works and Environmental Protection (2020–2021), industrial executive
- Vladimir Volodomanov (LDPR), Member of State Council of the Udmurt Republic (2025–present), construction executive

==== Withdrew after registration ====
- Iya Boronina (Yabloko), chairwoman of the party regional office, 2021 candidate for this seat (disqualified on September 10, 2026, for violating copyrights)

==== Results ====
Summary of the 18-20 September 2026 Russian legislative election in the Izhevsk constituency
Candidate	Party	Votes	%
Oleg Garin (incumbent)	United Russia	137,344	44.03%
Yury Balakhontsev	Communist Party	59,466	19.06%
Stanislav Shestakov	New People	30,960	9.93%
Vladimir Volodomanov	Liberal Democratic Party	23,323	7.48%
Konstantin Buzanov	Party of Pensioners	16,714	5.36%
Yulia Sadykova	Rodina	14,647	4.70%
Anton Golovkov	A Just Russia	13,956	4.47%
Andrey Saltykov	The Greens	7,414	2.38%
Total		311,923	100%
