= Oleg Garin (politician) =

Russian politician and motocross rider (born 1973)

- Олег Гарин

Member of the State Duma for Udmurtia
- Incumbent
- Assumed office 12 October 2021
- Preceded by: Valery Buzilov
- Constituency: Izhevsk (No. 34)

Personal details
- Born: 26 December 1973 (age 52) Igra, Udmurt ASSR, Russian SFSR, USSR
- Party: United Russia
- Children: 2
- Education: Udmurt State University; RANEPA (PhD)

Oleg Vladimirovich Garin (Russian: Олег Владимирович Гарин; born 26 December 1973) is a Russian politician and former champion in motocross. Since 2021 he has represented the Izhevsk constituency in the State Duma. Winner of the competition "Leaders of Russia. Politics".

== Biography ==
Born in the village of Igra in the Udmurt Republic. In 2001, he graduated from the Udmurt State University with a degree in jurisprudence, and in 2003, he graduated from the Russian Academy of Public Administration under the President of the Russian Federation with a degree in state and municipal administration, PhD in Economics.

From 1990 to 1991, he was the head of the motorcycle section of the Igrinsk station for young technicians.

From 1991 to 1995 – an employee of the car club of the Ural Automobile Plant.

From 1995 to 2002 — Deputy Director, Director of Virazh LLC.

From 2002 to 2004 – Director for General Affairs, Director of OAO Igrinskoye RTP.

Married, has two children.

== Political activity ==
He was elected a deputy of the Igrinsky District Council of Deputies of the second (1999—2002), third (2002—2006) and fourth (2006—2010) convocations, a deputy of the City Duma of the city of Izhevsk of the sixth (2015—2020) and seventh (2020—2025) convocations.

From 2004 to 2006 – Chairman of the Igrinsky District Council of Deputies.

From 2006 to 2011 – Head of the municipal formation "Igrinsky district".

From 2011 to 2014 — Minister of Transport and Road Facilities of the Udmurt Republic.

From April 2014 to September 2015 – Deputy Head of Administration – Chief of Staff of the Administration of the city of Izhevsk.

From 8 October 2015, to 8 October 2020 – Chairman of the City Duma of the city of Izhevsk.

From 2020 to 2021 – Deputy Chairman of the City Duma of the city of Izhevsk on a permanent basis.

On 19 September 2021, he was elected to the State Duma of Russia in the Izhevsk single-mandate constituency No. 34.

=== Sanctions ===
He was sanctioned by the UK government in 2022 in relation to the Russo-Ukrainian War.

== Awards ==
He was awarded the Certificate of Honor of the State Council of the Udmurt Republic, the Certificate of Honor of the Government of the Udmurt Republic, the Gratitude of the Minister of Sports, Tourism and Youth Policy of the Russian Federation, the Gratitude of the Chairman of the Federation Council of the Federal Assembly of the Russian Federation, the title of "Honored Coach".
