= 2027 Russian elections =

Regional elections in Russia

- 12 September 2027
- 2026 Russian regional elections: Gubernatorial; Gubernatorial and legislative; Legislative

The 2027 Russian elections will be held in Russia, in large part, on Sunday, 12 September 2027 (single election day), with several regions allowing voting on 10 and 11 September. 12 gubernatorial elections (11 direct and one indirectly elected), six regional parliamentary elections, and many elections on the municipal level will take place.

== Regional elections ==
=== Gubernatorial direct elections ===
In 2027 11 direct gubernatorial elections are scheduled to be held in Russia. This number can increase due to early retirements and rotations, if the resignation occurs prior to 12 June 2027. Direct gubernatorial elections in Russia are held using two-round system with the second round necessary in case no candidate achieves outright majority of votes, the most recent time second rounds were held in Russian gubernatorial elections occurred in 2018. First rounds of gubernatorial elections will be held only on single election day, 12 September 2027, with some regions will probably allow voting on 10 and 11 September. Three regions (Mari El, Kirov Oblast and Yaroslavl Oblast), where direct gubernatorial elections are currently scheduled to be held, allow self-nomination of gubernatorial candidates, while in eight others only registered political parties can nominate candidates.

Region	Incumbent	Status	Last race	Result
Buryatia	Alexey Tsydenov (ER)	Eligible	2022: 86.23%	TBD
Karelia	Artur Parfenchikov (ER)	Eligible	2022: 69.15%	TBD
Mari El	Yury Zaitsev (ER)	Eligible	2022: 82.44%	TBD
Udmurtia	Aleksandr Brechalov (ER)	Resigned	2022: 64.37%	TBD
Udmurtia	Olga Abramova (ER)	Acting Head	–	TBD
Primorsky Krai	Oleg Kozhemyako (ER)	Resigned	2023: 72.78%	TBD
Primorsky Krai	Konstantin Shestakov (ER)	Acting Governor	–	TBD
Kirov Oblast	Aleksandr Sokolov (ER)	Eligible	2022: 71.85%	TBD
Ryazan Oblast	Pavel Malkov (ER)	Eligible	2022: 84.55%	TBD
Saratov Oblast	Roman Busargin (ER)	Eligible	2022: 72.55%	TBD
Tomsk Oblast	Vladimir Mazur (ER)	Eligible	2022: 84.94%	TBD
Vladimir Oblast	Aleksandr Avdeyev (ER)	Eligible	2022: 83.68%	TBD
Yaroslavl Oblast	Mikhail Yevrayev (IND)	Eligible	2022: 82.31%	TBD

=== Gubernatorial indirect elections ===
In 2027 one indirect gubernatorial election is scheduled to be held in Russia. In the indirect gubernatorial election regional chief executive (Head or Governor) is elected in the regional legislature by a simple majority. Each political party with factions in the regional legislature or the State Duma submits up to three candidacies to the President of Russia who then selects three candidates and presents them to the regional legislature. Indirect gubernatorial elections in Adygea will probably be held only on single election day, 12 September 2027.

Region	Incumbent	Status	Last race	Result
Adygea	Murat Kumpilov (ER)	Eligible	2022: 49/49	TBD

=== Legislative elections ===
In 2027 regional legislative elections are scheduled to be held in six regions, the least for an electoral cycle in Russia. Parliament of the Republic of North Ossetia–Alania is elected by a party-list proportional representation with a 5% threshold, while regional legislatures in other five regions are elected by a parallel voting. United Russia will defend its majorities in every regional legislature it received following the 2022 elections.

Legislature	Seats	Voting system	Majority in last election		Majority after election
North Ossetia	70	Party-list proportional representation	United Russia	51 / 70	TBD
Udmurtia	60	Parallel (20 party list + 40 SMC)	United Russia	49 / 60	TBD
Krasnodar Krai	70	Parallel (25 party list + 45 SMC)	United Russia	62 / 70	TBD
Penza Oblast	36	Parallel (18 party list + 18 SMC)	United Russia	32 / 36	TBD
Sakhalin Oblast	28	Parallel (10 party list + 18 SMC)	United Russia	22 / 28	TBD
Saratov Oblast	40	Parallel (10 party list + 30 SMC)	United Russia	29 / 40	TBD

== Municipal elections ==
Numerous local elections will be held in Russia throughout 2027, both to the municipal councils and executive authorities. Since the adoption of the new federal law on local self-government direct mayoral elections can only be held in cities and towns, which do not hold the status of regional administrative centre, as well as in municipal districts and rural localities.

=== Mayoral elections ===
District	Incumbent	Date	Status	Last race	Results
Abaza (Khakassia)	Valentina Filimonova (ER)	Sep 12, 2027	Eligible	92.13%	TBD
Sayanogorsk (Khakassia)	Yevgeny Molodnyakov (ER)	Sep 12, 2027	Eligible	68.06%	TBD
Usolye-Sibirskoye (Irkutsk Oblast)	Maksim Toropkin (ER)	Sep 12, 2027	Eligible	87.03%	TBD

=== District elections ===
District	Incumbent	Date	Status	Last race	Results
Altaysky District (Khakassia)	Irina Voynova (ER)	Sep 12, 2027	Eligible	84.87%	TBD
Tashtypsky District (Khakassia)	Nikolay Chebodayev (IND)	Sep 12, 2027	Eligible	48.85%	TBD

=== Municipal Council elections ===
Municipal body	Seats	Voting system	Majority in last election		Majority after election
Gorno-Altaysk City Council of Deputies (Altai Republic)	21	First-past-the-post	United Russia	20 / 21	TBD
Duma of Cherkessk (Karachay-Cherkessia)	33	Party-list proportional representation	United Russia	23 / 33	TBD
Khural of Representatives of Kyzyl (Tuva)	26	Parallel (13 party list + 13 SMC)	United Russia	22 / 26	TBD
Barnaul City Duma (Altai Krai)	40	Parallel (20 party list + 20 SMC)	United Russia	31 / 40	TBD
City Duma of Petropavlovsk-Kamchatsky (Kamchatka Krai)	30	Parallel (10 party list + 10 DMC)	United Russia	22 / 30	TBD
Duma of Vladivostok (Primorsky Krai)	35	First-past-the-post	United Russia	28 / 35	TBD
Kirov City Duma (Kirov Oblast)	36	Parallel (18 party list + 18 SMC)	United Russia	23 / 36	TBD
Kursk City Assembly (Kursk Oblast)	34	Parallel (17 party list + 17 SMC)	United Russia	27 / 34	TBD
Omsk City Council (Omsk Oblast)	40	First-past-the-post	United Russia	35 / 40	TBD
Pskov City Duma (Pskov Oblast)	25	Parallel (10 party list + 25 SMC)	United Russia	19 / 25	TBD
Tver City Duma (Tver Oblast)	25	First-past-the-post	United Russia	25 / 25	TBD
Municipality of Yaroslavl (Yaroslavl Oblast)	38	First-past-the-post	United Russia	34 / 38	TBD
Municipality of Yaroslavl (Yaroslavl Oblast)	38	First-past-the-post	United Russia	34 / 38	TBD
Municipal Councils of Moscow	1,417	Plurality block	United Russia	1,160 / 1,417	TBD
