= 2022 Udmurtia State Council election =

- 9–11 September 2022
- Turnout: 39.79%
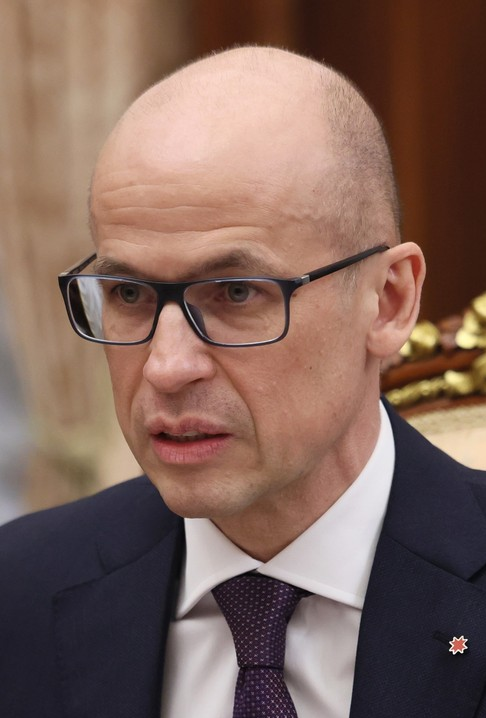

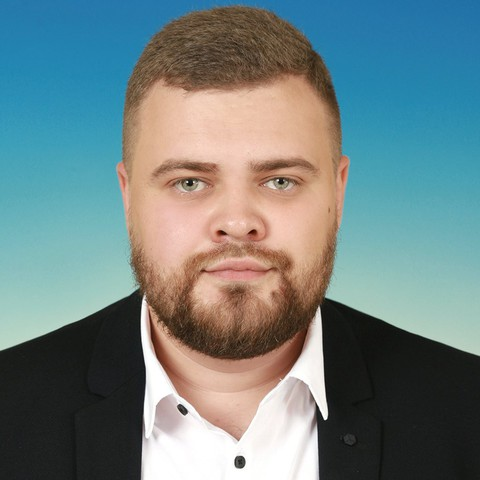
	Majority party	Minority party	Third party
		CPRF	LDPR
Candidate	Aleksandr Brechalov	Vladimir Bodrov	Timur Yagafarov
Leader	Dmitry Medvedev	Gennady Zyuganov	Leonid Slutsky
Party	United Russia	CPRF	LDPR
Last election	47 seats, 63.16%	5 seats, 14.86%	2 seats, 8.95%
Seats won	49	3	4
Seat change	▲2	▼2	▲2
Popular vote	237,064	72,212	63,319
Percentage	51.07%	15.56%	13.64%
Swing	▼12.09%	▲0.70%	▲4.69%
	Fourth party	Fifth party	Sixth party
	SR-ZP	RPPSS
Candidate	Andrey Smirnov	Pavel Kulnev	Sergey Chudaev
Leader	Sergey Mironov	Vladimir Burakov	Aleksey Nechayev
Party	SR-ZP	Party of Pensioners	New People
Last election	2 seats, 6.57%	Did not participate	Did not exist
Seats won	2	0	0
Seat change	0	Did not participate	Did not exist
Popular vote	28,120	21,703	19,217
Percentage	6.06%	4.68%	4.14%
Swing	▼0.51%	Did not participate	Did not exist

The 2022 State Council of the Udmurt Republic election took place on 9–11 September 2022, on common election day, coinciding with the head election. All 60 seats in the State Council were up for reelection.

== Electoral system ==
Under current election laws, the State Council is elected for a term of five years, with parallel voting. 20 seats are elected by party-list proportional representation with a 5% electoral threshold, with the other half elected in 40 single-member constituencies by first-past-the-post voting. Until 2022 the number of mandates allocated in proportional and majoritarian parts were standing at 30 each. Seats in the proportional part are allocated using the Imperiali quota, modified to ensure that every party list, which passes the threshold, receives at least one mandate.

== Candidates ==
=== Party lists ===
To register regional lists of candidates, parties need to collect 0.5% of signatures of all registered voters in Udmurtia.

The following parties were relieved from the necessity to collect signatures:

- United Russia
- Communist Party of the Russian Federation
- A Just Russia — Patriots — For Truth
- Liberal Democratic Party of Russia
- New People
- Rodina
- Patriots of Russia
- Russian Party of Pensioners for Social Justice
- Green Alternative

№	Party	Republic-wide list	Candidates	Territorial groups	Status
1	A Just Russia — For Truth	~~Dmitry Begishev~~ • Andrey Smirnov • Igor Strelkov	36	12	Registered
2	Rodina	Aleksey Glukhov • Vladislav Rozov • Nikita Gabov	27	12	Registered
3	Party of Pensioners	Pavel Kulnev • Veronika Lekomtseva • Lyudmila Korepanova	26	12	Registered
4	Liberal Democratic Party	Timur Yagafarov • Anton Kuznetsov	38	12	Registered
5	United Russia	Aleksandr Brechalov • Tatyana Ishmatova • Ivan Cherezov	47	12	Registered
6	New People	Sergey Chudaev • Ruslan Ivanov • Yekaterina Shklyayeva	41	12	Registered
7	Communist Party	Vladimir Bodrov • Aleksandr Syrov • Yury Balakhontsev	42	12	Registered
8	Green Alternative	Georgy Leshchev • Dmitry Zakharov • Artur Selimkhanov	22	12	Registered
	Communists of Russia	Yury Mishkin	13	12	Failed to qualify

New People, RPPSS and Green Alternative will take part in Udmurtia legislative election for the first time.

=== Single-mandate constituencies ===
40 single-mandate constituencies were formed in Udmurtia, an increase of 10 seats since last redistricting in 2017.

To register candidates in single-mandate constituencies need to collect 3% of signatures of registered voters in the constituency.

Number of candidates in single-mandate constituencies
Party	Candidates	
Party	Nominated	Registered
United Russia	40	37
Communist Party	38	34
Liberal Democratic Party	41	39
A Just Russia — For Truth	39	36
New People	40	37
Party of Pensioners	20	17
Green Alternative	13	11
Rodina	8	7
Independent	8	3
Total	247	221

== Polls ==
Fieldwork date	Polling firm	UR	CPRF	LDPR	SR-ZP	NL	Other parties
15–20 August 2022	ИНСОМАР	53%	14%	11%	6%	3%	13%

== Results ==
Summary of the 9–11 September 2022 State Council of the Udmurt Republic election results
Party	Party list					Constituency		Total	
Party	Votes	%	±pp	Seats	+/–	Seats	+/–	Seats	+/–
United Russia	237,064	51.07	▼12.09%	13	▼10	36	▲12	49	▲2
Communist Party	72,212	15.56	▲0.70%	3	▼1	0	▼1	3	▼2
Liberal Democratic Party	63,319	13.64	▲4.69%	3	▲1	1	▲1	4	▲2
A Just Russia — For Truth	28,120	6.06	▼0.51%	1	0	1	0	2	0
Party of Pensioners	21,703	4.68	New	0	New	0	New	0	New
New People	19,217	4.14	New	0	New	0	New	0	New
Green Alternative	5,426	1.17	New	0	New	0	New	0	New
Rodina	3,174	0.68	▼1.26%	0	Steady	1	▲1	1	▲1
Independents	—	—	—	—	—	1	▼3	1	▼3
Invalid ballots	13,919	3.00	▼0.09%	—	—	—	—	—	—
Total	464,257	100.00	—	20	▼10	40	▲10	60	Steady
Turnout	464,257	39.79	▲5.25%	—	—	—	—	—	—
Registered voters	1,166,741	100.00	—	—	—	—	—	—	—

Summary of the 9–11 September 2022 State Council of the Udmurt Republic election results by constituency
№	Candidate	Party	Votes	%
1	Irina Pligina	United Russia	3,957	49.65%
1	Ruslan Kultashev	Communist Party	1,045	13.11%
1	Dmitry Orlov	A Just Russia — For Truth	1,008	12.65%
1	Aleksey Zaytsev	Green Alternative	639	8.02%
1	Andrey Frolov	New People	536	6.73%
1	Nikolay Seliverstov	Party of Pensioners	358	4.49%
1	Total		7,970	100%
1	Source:			
2	Diana Kropotina	United Russia	3,220	39.75%
2	Natalya Kuznetsova	A Just Russia — For Truth	1,689	20.85%
2	Aleksey Novikov	Communist Party	1,073	13.25%
2	Yakov Lipin	Liberal Democratic Party	1,000	12.34%
2	Yelena Luzhbina	New People	755	9.32%
2	Total		8,101	100%
2	Source:			
3	Eduard Babayan	United Russia	3,317	40.24%
3	Tanzilya Abdullina	A Just Russia — For Truth	1,533	18.60%
3	Nikolay Akulov	Communist Party	1,240	15.04%
3	Vladimir Volodomanov	Liberal Democratic Party	976	11.84%
3	Ksenia Yuzhakova	New People	447	5.42%
3	Artur Selimkhanov	Green Alternative	272	3.30%
3	Total		8,243	100%
3	Source:			
4	Ramil Gaynullin	United Russia	4,679	56.80%
4	Lev Korobeynikov	Communist Party	999	12.13%
4	Aleksandr Svetlakov	Liberal Democratic Party	876	10.63%
4	Renat Fakhrutdinov	Party of Pensioners	447	5.43%
4	Igor Mikhaylov	New People	356	4.32%
4	Georgy Chukavin	A Just Russia — For Truth	341	4.14%
4	Vasily Svetlakov	Independent	106	1.29%
4	Total		8,237	100%
4	Source:			
5	Nail Mukhamedzyanov (incumbent)	United Russia	4,890	53.32%
5	Aleksandr Dodin	Liberal Democratic Party	1,306	14.24%
5	Ilyas Yakupov	A Just Russia — For Truth	917	10.00%
5	Galina Utkina	Party of Pensioners	749	8.17%
5	Karina Bormotova	New People	578	6.30%
5	Irina Trubitsina	Rodina	199	2.17%
5	Total		9,171	100%
5	Source:			
6	Viktor Dyakov	United Russia	3,830	42.54%
6	Aleksey Batalov	Liberal Democratic Party	1,745	19.38%
6	Ivan Gvozdak	Communist Party	1,106	12.28%
6	Marat Shigapov	A Just Russia — For Truth	555	6.16%
6	Nikita Babkin	Party of Pensioners	522	5.80%
6	Mikhail Mikhaylyk	New People	342	3.80%
6	Ivan Gvazdak	Rodina	165	1.83%
6	Total		9,003	100%
6	Source:			
7	Sergey Lukyanchikov (incumbent)	United Russia	3,588	43.59%
7	Mikhail Veretennikov	Communist Party	1,339	16.27%
7	Irina Semenova	Liberal Democratic Party	1,185	14.40%
7	Sergey Gromov	A Just Russia — For Truth	879	10.68%
7	Ruslan Ivanov	New People	769	9.34%
7	Total		8,232	100%
7	Source:			
8	Andrey Babin	United Russia	3,309	37.23%
8	Olga Kletskina	Communist Party	1,781	20.04%
8	Yulia Voronchikhina	New People	1,361	15.31%
8	Yulia Terentyeva	A Just Russia — For Truth	1,000	11.25%
8	Anna Surikova	Liberal Democratic Party	979	11.01%
8	Total		8,889	100%
8	Source:			
9	Marina Lukina	United Russia	3,405	40.58%
9	Veronika Fedorova	Communist Party	1,478	17.61%
9	Maksim Tensin	Liberal Democratic Party	1,254	14.94%
9	Natalya Yengalycheva	New People	836	9.96%
9	Ilya Vakhotin	A Just Russia — For Truth	577	6.88%
9	Andrey Saltykov	Green Alternative	402	4.79%
9	Total		8,391	100%
9	Source:			
10	Timur Yagafarov	Liberal Democratic Party	4,113	44.99%
10	Pavel Berlinsky	New People	1,586	17.35%
10	Yelena Frolova	Communist Party	1,417	15.50%
10	Olga Zharkova	A Just Russia — For Truth	524	5.73%
10	Diana Frolova	Green Alternative	392	4.29%
10	Total		9,143	100%
10	Source:			
11	Dmitry Mukhanov	United Russia	3,178	35.85%
11	Aleksey Konoryukov	A Just Russia — For Truth	1,474	16.63%
11	Aleksey Kuznetsov	Liberal Democratic Party	1,440	16.24%
11	Stanislav Polishchuk	Communist Party	1,171	13.21%
11	Lyudmila Korepanova	Party of Pensioners	1,115	12.58%
11	Total		8,865	100%
11	Source:			
12	Andrey Denisov (incumbent)	United Russia	3,065	37.42%
12	Stanislav Buldakov	Communist Party	1,630	19.90%
12	Sergey Korolev	A Just Russia — For Truth	1,099	13.42%
12	Galina Polevaya	New People	1,036	12.65%
12	Pyotr Yankin	Liberal Democratic Party	899	10.98%
12	Total		8,191	100%
12	Source:			
13	Galina Onishchenko (incumbent)	United Russia	3,850	43.69%
13	Aleksandr Perevoshchikov	A Just Russia — For Truth	1,399	15.87%
13	Elgiz Gadzhiyev	Communist Party	1,257	14.26%
13	Yekaterina Shklyayeva	New People	944	10.71%
13	Ksenia Zavoyskikh	Liberal Democratic Party	902	10.23%
13	Total		8,813	100%
13	Source:			
14	Katrina Selezneva	United Russia	3,611	39.12%
14	Farid Yunusov	A Just Russia — For Truth	1,502	16.27%
14	Dmitry Sedykh	Communist Party	1,257	14.26%
14	Tatyana Shutova	Liberal Democratic Party	1,084	11.74%
14	Aleksandr Pyatov	New People	572	6.20%
14	Aleksandra Korepanova	Party of Pensioners	429	4.65%
14	Pavel Mikhaylov	Green Alternative	181	1.96%
14	Tatyana Yakovleva	Rodina	115	1.25%
14	Total		9,230	100%
14	Source:			
15	Linara Sorokolet	Independent	2,811	32.41%
15	Artur Islamov	New People	1,701	19.61%
15	Yelena Rakhmanova	Liberal Democratic Party	1,165	13.43%
15	Alina Bakhtiyarova	Party of Pensioners	1,090	12.57%
15	Vladislav Pivovarov	Green Alternative	800	9.22%
15	Total		8,673	100%
15	Source:			
16	Aleksandr Murashov	United Russia	3,909	44.68%
16	Sergey Russkikh	Communist Party	1,173	13.41%
16	Ilya Gilyazov	Liberal Democratic Party	805	9.20%
16	Alina Petrova	Green Alternative	559	6.39%
16	Anvar Islamov	New People	513	5.86%
16	Kharis Buzikov	A Just Russia — For Truth	449	5.13%
16	Natalya Begisheva	Party of Pensioners	379	4.33%
16	Mikhail Krasnoperov	Rodina	372	4.25%
16	Total		8,748	100%
16	Source:			
17	Aleksandr Khramtsovsky	Rodina	3,008	33.15%
17	Anton Kuznetsov	Liberal Democratic Party	2,535	27.93%
17	Konstantin Begishev	Party of Pensioners	1,405	15.48%
17	Aleksey Begishev	Green Alternative	1,241	13.67%
17	Total		9,075	100%
17	Source:			
18	Anton Borodulin	United Russia	6,466	62.98%
18	Dmitry Kolyasnikov	Communist Party	1,256	12.23%
18	Valery Kuznetsov	Liberal Democratic Party	1,132	11.03%
18	Andrey Chashchin	A Just Russia — For Truth	475	4.63%
18	Sofia Kubina	New People	464	4.52%
18	Total		10,266	100%
18	Source:			
19	Sergey Zuyev (incumbent)	United Russia	6,208	56.01%
19	Viktor Sitnikov	Communist Party	1,904	17.18%
19	Andrey Mukhitdinov	Liberal Democratic Party	1,193	10.76%
19	Olga Chernenko	A Just Russia — For Truth	566	5.11%
19	Valeria Mamayeva	New People	511	4.61%
19	Total		11,083	100%
19	Source:			
20	Vladimir Palshin (incumbent)	United Russia	3,940	40.92%
20	Yelena Maslennikova	Communist Party	2,707	28.12%
20	Andrey Blinov	A Just Russia — For Truth	1,171	12.16%
20	Aleksey Danilov	Liberal Democratic Party	782	8.12%
20	Alyona Mokrushina	New People	462	4.80%
20	Total		9,628	100%
20	Source:			
21	Sergey Chineykin	United Russia	6,383	57.89%
21	Aleksey Melekhin	A Just Russia — For Truth	2,145	19.45%
21	Ilya Vetrov	Communist Party	928	8.42%
21	Svetlana Mikryukova	Liberal Democratic Party	795	7.21%
21	Anastasia Yulasheva	New People	210	1.90%
21	Total		11,027	100%
21	Source:			
22	Rashit Abashev	United Russia	5,438	50.04%
22	Yury Balakhontsev	Communist Party	2,993	27.54%
22	Andrey Velichinsky	Liberal Democratic Party	758	6.98%
22	Stanislav Burmistrov	A Just Russia — For Truth	617	5.68%
22	Roman Balobanov	New People	429	3.95%
22	Ilya Kuzmin	Green Alternative	133	1.22%
22	Total		10,867	100%
22	Source:			
23	Anatoly Naumov	United Russia	7,676	60.76%
23	Vladislav Vysotsky	A Just Russia — For Truth	1,413	11.18%
23	Igor Korobov	Communist Party	1,348	10.67%
23	Valery Glukhov	Liberal Democratic Party	945	7.48%
23	Sergey Vetluzhskikh	New People	625	4.95%
23	Total		12,633	100%
23	Source:			
24	Aleksey Malyuk	United Russia	5,548	50.24%
24	Denis Dunayev	Communist Party	1,718	15.56%
24	Natalya Vetluzhskikh	New People	1,182	10.70%
24	Aleksandr Popotsov	A Just Russia — For Truth	1,135	10.28%
24	Dmitry Kechko	Liberal Democratic Party	887	8.03%
24	Total		11,042	100%
24	Source:			
25	Sergey Sidorov	United Russia	13,270	70.65%
25	Anatoly Kobelev	Liberal Democratic Party	2,892	15.40%
25	Mikhail Klyuyev	New People	1,941	10.33%
25	Total		18,783	100%
25	Source:			
26	Aleksey Sannikov (incumbent)	United Russia	6,541	52.02%
26	Oleg Strelkov	Communist Party	2,613	20.78%
26	Sergey Zhuykov	A Just Russia — For Truth	1,644	13.07%
26	Nikita Dekterev	Liberal Democratic Party	759	6.04%
26	Aleksandr Bakhmatov	New People	420	3.34%
26	Total		12,574	100%
26	Source:			
27	Vladislav Kochetkov	United Russia	6,831	55.56%
27	Yelena Vlasova	Liberal Democratic Party	1,872	15.23%
27	Nikolay Nikitin	Party of Pensioners	1,530	12.45%
27	Dmitry Ogleznev	A Just Russia — For Truth	796	6.47%
27	Sergey Pankov	New People	541	4.40%
27	Total		12,294	100%
27	Source:			
28	Andrey Volkov	United Russia	5,385	45.81%
28	Vladimir Chepkasov	Communist Party	2,422	20.60%
28	Dmitry Tselousov	Liberal Democratic Party	1,707	14.52%
28	Olga Cherkasova	A Just Russia — For Truth	1,391	11.83%
28	Dmitry Krivoshein	New People	342	2.91%
28	Total		11,755	100%
28	Source:			
29	Dmitry Kuznetsov (incumbent)	United Russia	5,936	45.31%
29	Dmitry Trubachev	A Just Russia — For Truth	2,106	16.08%
29	Aleksandr Ivanov	Liberal Democratic Party	1,961	14.97%
29	Nina Krasnoperova	Party of Pensioners	1,298	9.91%
29	Vladislav Vorontsov	New People	1,171	8.94%
29	Total		13,101	100%
29	Source:			
30	Yelena Derbilova	United Russia	5,612	50.02%
30	Vladimir Khristenko	Communist Party	1,245	11.10%
30	Aleksandr Zakharikov	Liberal Democratic Party	1,097	9.78%
30	Angelina Bulatova	A Just Russia — For Truth	1,084	9.66%
30	Aleksandr Berezin	Party of Pensioners	1,044	9.30%
30	Denis Korovkin	New People	705	6.28%
30	Total		11,220	100%
30	Source:			
31	Dmitry Lukin	United Russia	7,343	52.56%
31	Andrey Rozhkin	Communist Party	3,264	23.36%
31	Vladimir Markevich	Party of Pensioners	875	6.26%
31	Aleksandr Vologdin	A Just Russia — For Truth	770	5.51%
31	Yury Nevela	Liberal Democratic Party	712	5.10%
31	Anton Obukhov	New People	508	3.64%
31	Total		13,970	100%
31	Source:			
32	Dmitry Arsibekov (incumbent)	United Russia	7,887	64.32%
32	Sergey Tomashevich	Communist Party	1,691	13.79%
32	Yulia Zalilova	Liberal Democratic Party	734	5.99%
32	Ivan Shadrin	A Just Russia — For Truth	654	5.33%
32	Natalya Lebedeva	New People	645	5.26%
32	Dmitry Zakharov	Green Alternative	183	1.49%
32	Total		13,970	100%
32	Source:			
33	Igor Strelkov	A Just Russia — For Truth	5,969	40.58%
33	Andrey Ulanov	United Russia	5,430	36.92%
33	Bogdan Vladykin	Independent	805	5.47%
33	Aleksandr Orlov	Communist Party	780	5.30%
33	Yevgeny Strelkov	Green Alternative	657	4.47%
33	Aleksandr Tuymatov	Liberal Democratic Party	325	2.21%
33	Ignat Lekontsev	Rodina	201	1.37%
33	Total		14,709	100%
33	Source:			
34	Pyotr Fomin	United Russia	7,448	47.65%
34	Pavel Chushyalov (incumbent)	Communist Party	5,466	34.97%
34	Viktor Kuznetsov	A Just Russia — For Truth	1,247	7.98%
34	Aleksey Barmin	Liberal Democratic Party	783	5.01%
34	Nikolay Ryabkov	New People	295	1.89%
34	Total		15,632	100%
34	Source:			
35	Aleksey Vershinin (incumbent)	United Russia	9,963	60.17%
35	Ruslan Kolbasyuk	Communist Party	2,499	15.09%
35	Aleksey Nevostruyev	Liberal Democratic Party	1,368	8.26%
35	Sergey Vorobyev	Party of Pensioners	1,287	7.77%
35	Olga Bekhtereva	New People	633	3.82%
35	Leonid Demyanovich	A Just Russia — For Truth	315	1.90%
35	Total		16,559	100%
35	Source:			
36	Aleksandr Korobeynikov	United Russia	7,607	53.83%
36	Sergey Kulalayev	A Just Russia — For Truth	2,199	15.56%
36	Elvira Lutfullina	Liberal Democratic Party	1,236	8.75%
36	Galina Polonyankina	Communist Party	1,093	7.73%
36	Yevgeny Matyunin	Party of Pensioners	883	6.25%
36	Vladislav Shamshurin	New People	484	3.43%
36	Total		14,131	100%
36	Source:			
37	Andrey Uraskin (incumbent)	United Russia	7,810	45.26%
37	Sergey Kurbatov	A Just Russia — For Truth	4,235	24.54%
37	Stanislav Ovechkin	Communist Party	3,409	19.67%
37	Aleksandr Panteleyev	Liberal Democratic Party	787	4.56%
37	Maria Furd	New People	241	1.40%
37	Total		17,256	100%
37	Source:			
38	Aleksandr Sazonov	United Russia	5,057	37.24%
38	Oleg Bobrov (incumbent)	New People	4,496	33.11%
38	Maria Ushakova	Communist Party	1,486	10.94%
38	Faina Kostina	Party of Pensioners	982	7.23%
38	Mikhail Arzamastsev	Liberal Democratic Party	738	5.43%
38	Vladimir Ovsyannikov	A Just Russia — For Truth	322	2.37%
38	Total		13,581	100%
38	Source:			
39	Anatoly Khokhryakov	United Russia	12,250	68.07%
39	Natalya Vakhitova	Communist Party	1,790	9.95%
39	Sofya Andreyeva	A Just Russia — For Truth	1,311	7.28%
39	Andrey Yushkov	Liberal Democratic Party	793	4.41%
39	Andrey Kalabin	New People	600	3.33%
39	Aleksandr Manakhov	Party of Pensioners	539	2.99%
39	Total		17,997	100%
39	Source:			
40	Vladimir Nevostruyev (incumbent)	United Russia	10,747	71.12%
40	Mikhail Kasimov	Communist Party	1,846	12.22%
40	Aleksey Shansherov	Liberal Democratic Party	784	5.19%
40	Aleksey Abashev	New People	744	4.92%
40	Vitaly Kozyrev	A Just Russia — For Truth	385	2.55%
40	Total		15,112	100%
40	Source:			

Incumbent Senator Yury Fyodorov (United Russia) was re-appointed to the Federation Council.

== See also ==
- 2022 Russian regional elections
