= Olga Abramova (politician, born 1981) =

Russian politician

- Ольга Абрамова
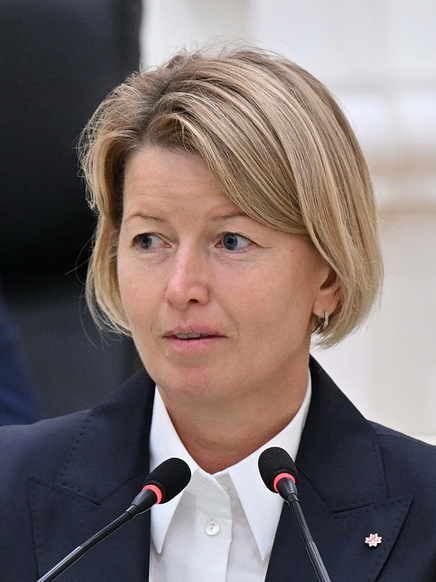
- Abramova in 2026

Head of the Udmurt Republic
- Acting
- Assumed office 29 July 2026
- Preceded by: Aleksandr Brechalov

Personal details
- Born: 23 November 1981 (age 44) Sigayevo, Sarapulsky District, Udmurt ASSR, Russian SFSR, Soviet Union
- Party: United Russia
- Children: 2
- Education: MESI

Olga Viktorovna Abramova (Russian: Ольга Викторовна Абрамова; born 23 November 1981) is a Russian politician who has served as acting head of the Udmurt Republic since 29 July 2026.

Abramova was born in Sigayevo, Sarapulsky District of Udmurtia. In 2003, she graduated from the Moscow Institute of Economics, Statistics, and Informatics (MESI).

In 2006–09, Olga Abramova worked first as chief economist and then as general director at the "Udmurtia" agro-industrial company in Sarapul. In 2009–12 she headed the economics department of the ministry of agriculture of Udmurtia. In 2018, Abramova was appointed minister of agriculture, and in September 2023, she became first deputy premier of Udmurtia for the economy. In July 2024, after the resignation of then-premier Yaroslav Semyonov, she left the Udmurt government, and in October of the same year, Abramova became an adviser to the Russian agriculture minister Oksana Lut. On 29 July 2026, after the resignation of Aleksandr Brechalov as head of Udmurtia, Abramova was appointed acting head of the republic. Election for the office is due to be held in September 2027.
