= Kedra Mitrei =

Kedra Mitrei Кедра Митрей
- Born: 28 September 1892; Igra, Vyatka Governorate, Russian Empire
- Died: 11 November 1949 (aged 57); Tchumakovo village, Novosibirsk Oblast, USSR
- Occupations: writer, poet, publicist
- Spouse: Korepanova (Savickaja) Anna Stanislavovna – Корепанова (Савицкая) Анна Станиславовна
- Writing career
- Genres: Romanticism, realism

Kedra Mitrei (Dmitrij Ivanovich Korepanov – Кедра Митрей, Дмитрий Ива́нович Коре́панов) was an Udmurt writer, poet, publicist, critic and translator.

== Early life ==
Mitrei was born into the family of a coachman. The family was poor, but placed a value on education. For example, before the Russian Revolution, Mitrei's brother was educated as an agronomist. In 1907 Mitrei entered the Kazan teachers' seminary. There he published a secret handwritten journal called Sandal (stithy), in which he wrote his first stories together with Maxim Prokopiev. In 1911 he was expelled from the seminary for atheism.

In 1911, he was published by a major medium for the first time when St. Petersburg newspaper Capital Answers ran "Motovilikha", a short story. That same year, he was expelled from the seminar for atheism, but escaped further punishment, since criminal punishment for atheism was abolished after the revolution of 1905–1907.

Between 1911 and 1914, Mitrei traveled to his native land, collecting folklore.

=== First World War and Russian Revolution ===
He passed the teachers' examination in 1912 while not yet unemployed. He obtained a teaching position in 1914, shortly before he was drafted into the Imperial Russian Army to fight in the First World War. He served in Blagoveshchensk, where in 1915 he published the tragedy Esh-Tereck under the noble pseudonym Pan Rajmit. Because of censorship, the piece was published in Russian only and in abridged form as the fourth act was not allowed to be printed.

While serving in the army in 1915, Mitrei married Anna S. Savitskaya. They remained married until Mitrei's death. Immediately after the Revolution, he participated in the work of local Soviets. After Kolchak's power was established in Siberia, he participated in the red guerrilla movement.

=== Post-revolution ===
He returned home in 1920 and two years later joined the CPSU. For three years he headed the Department of Education in Zore and Debesy. He was editor of the newspaper Gudyri ('Thunder') from 1923 to 1928. During this period, most of his literary works were created. Between 1928 and 1930 he was the director of the pedagogical school in Glazov (now Glazov State Pedagogical Institute). Mitrei returned to education from 1930 to 1932 and earned a PhD in philology. The following five years he spent in Izhevsk, engaged in literature, research and teaching at Udmurt State University.

=== Arrests and death ===
On 21 July 1937 he was arrested. Like many non-Russian intellectuals, he was accused of associating with Japanese intelligence. Accused of nationalism, Mitrei was sent to a Gulag near Magadan, from which he was released after nine years in 1946. However, he was rearrested on 27 December 1948. He died in Tchumakovo village, Novosibirsk Oblast on 11 November 1949, aged 57.

== Main works ==
- Child of the sick century (1911), an autobiography first published in a censored version in 1965. The full text was published for the first time in 2005.
- 1912–1928: Trilogy about Heroes. The trilogy was conceived in 1911, and the first part, the tragedy Esh-Terek, was written in 1912, three years before the first edition as published. It is written on the basis of the folklore he collected. The names of the works coincide with the names of the main characters, popular batyrs of Udmurt folklore. The trilogy consists of:
  - 1) The tragedy Esh-Terek (1912). The action takes place in the 16th century; the background is the ongoing conflict between the Cheremis and Udmurts.
  - 2) Idna-Batyr (1926). The action takes place on the eve of the events described in Esh-Terek. The author tries to understand what pushes people to inflict violence onto one another.
  - 3) The poem "Juber-Batyr" (1928). Set before the events of Idna-Batyr, this poem depicts a tragedy which accompanied the seizure of the Udmurt lands by the Russian Tsardom.
- Vujghurt (1926) (Вужгурт 'Old Village'), is a story about the life of the Udmurt village during the revolution era (1904–1920 year). The main character (Dalko Simon) displays autobiographical features.
- Sekyt Zybet (1929) (Секыт зӥбет 'Heavy Oppression'), is the first major novel in Udmurt literature. The plot surrounds the forced Christianization of the Udmurts and anti-feudal resistance. It is Mitrei's most famous work and the most famous in Udmurt literature. Before the author's arrest, two editions were published in 1929 and 1935. In 1932, it was translated into and published in Russian. The novel was released several times after the author's rehabilitation.
- Zurka Vujghurt (1936) (Зурка Вужгурт – 'Shaken Old Village'), is the Vujghurt story's second, reworked edition. In this edition, the author describes colonial oppression. However, some revolutionaries, which at that time were declared "enemies of the people", remained positive characters in the novel, a fact used against Mitrei in his prosecution.

== Other works and translations ==
Mitrei wrote plays, stories and poems. He was the author of research articles on Udmurt philology and folklore. Mitrei translated several works by Maxim Gorky and one story by Finnish writer Pietari Päivärinta into the Udmurt language. He started the translation of Das Kapital, but his arrest ended the project.

== Legacy ==
- In 1983, Ziyara Artyomovna Veselaya wrote a novel about Mitrei called With hope and faith.
- In 1987, in the Igra settlement one of the streets was named in honor of the writer.
- In 1992, a monument was placed in the Igra settlement at the site of his parents' home.

== Literature ==
- Большая российская энциклопедия – Большая российская энциклопедия, 2016. – 768 с. – ISBN 978-5-85270-320-0 (in Russian)
- Богомолова, З. А. Творчество Кедра Митрея / З. А. Богомолова. – Ижевск : Удмуртия, 1967. – 116 с.(in Russian)
- Богомолова, З. А. История удмуртского романа : учеб. пособие / З. А. Богомолова, Удмурт. гос. ун-т. – Ижевск, 1978. – 134, [2] с. (in Russian)
- Горбушин, М. В. Ӵукна ӟардыку : писательёс сярысь очеркъёс / М. В. Горбушин. – Ижевск : Удмуртия, 1982. – 68 б. (in Udmurt)
- Михайловская, Н. М. Романы "Тяжкое иго" Кедра Митрея и "Старый Мултан" М. Петрова : учеб. пособие для сред. школ. Удмурт. АССР / Михайловская Н. М. – Ижевск : Удмуртское книжное издательство, 1959. (in Russian)
- Опаленный подвиг батыра. Жизнь и творчество Кедра Митрея : воспоминания, статьи, письма, посвящения и произведения Кедра Митрея / сост. З. А. Богомолова; подгот. текста З. А. Богомоловой. – Ижевск : Удмуртия, 2003. – 351, [1] с. ISBN 5-7659-0153-0 (in Russian)
- Хакимова В. Х. Кедра Митрей и Гаяз Исхаки: достойные сыновья своих народов: монография / В. Л. Хакимова; М-во образования и науки Удмуртской Республики, Ижевск : Шелест, 2015. – 121. ISBN 978-5-906027-17-7 (in Russian)
