= Glazov State Pedagogical Institute =

Coordinates: 58°08′15″N 52°40′27″E

Glazov State Pedagogical Institute named after V. G. Korolenko
- Глазовский Государственный Педагогический институт имени В. Г. Короленко
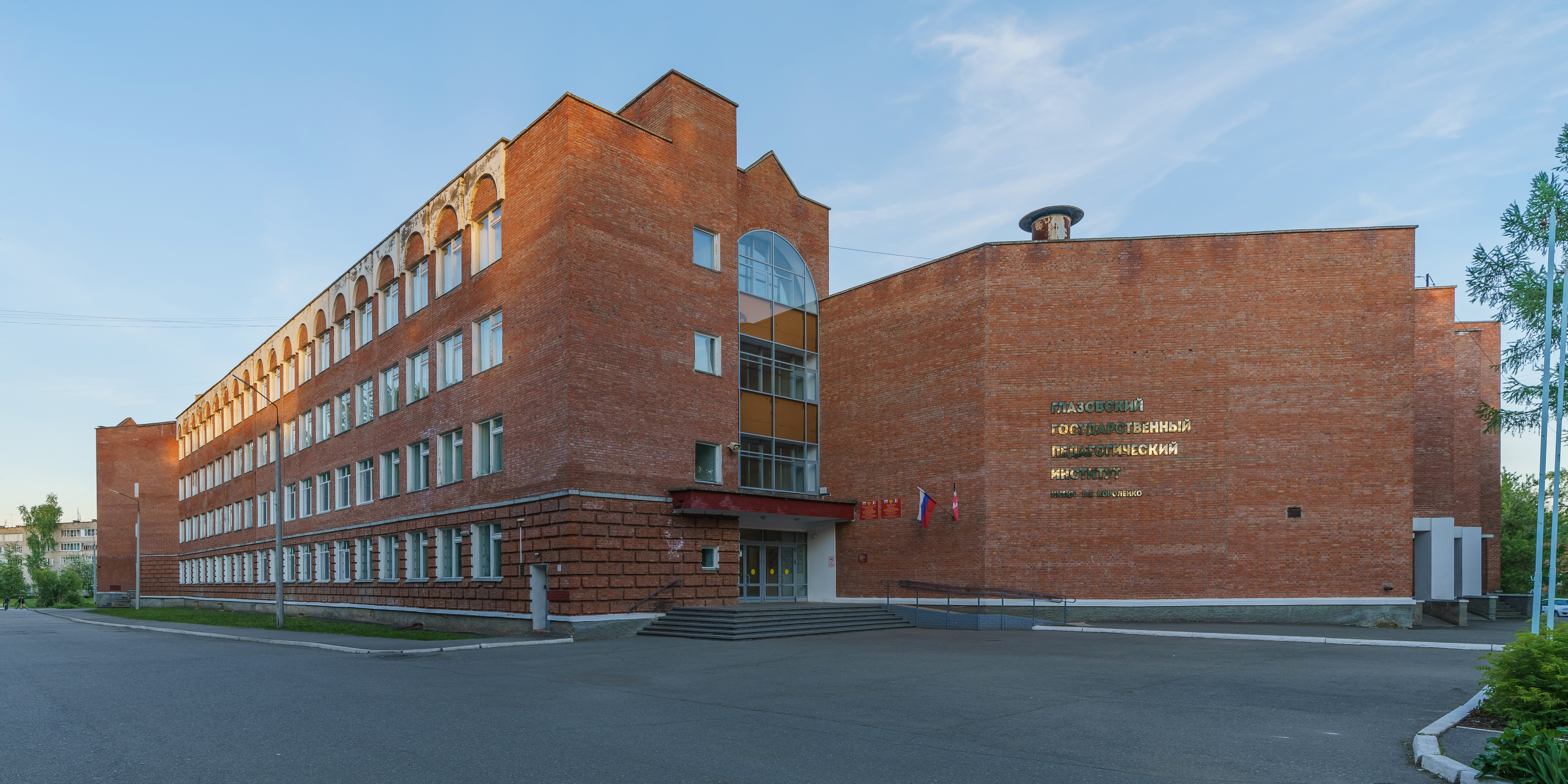
- Type: public
- Established: 1952
- Rector: Yanina Tchigovskaya-Nazarova
- Students: 2300
- Location: 25 Pervomayskaya Street, Glazov, Udmurt Republic, Russia
- Campus: urban
- Website: www.ggpi.org

The Glazov State Pedagogical Institute named after V. G. Korolenko (Russian: Глазовский Государственный Педагогический институт имени В. Г. Короленко, ГГПИ) is an instite of higher pedagogical education in Glazov, Udmurt Republic, Russia.

== History ==
In 1939 in accordance with the Council of People's Commissars of Udmurt Autonomous Soviet Socialist Republic resolution, the Glazov Teacher's Institute was established. In 1946, it was named after Russian writer Vladimir Korolenko. In 1952, it was reorganized into the Glazov State Pedagogical Institute and included two faculties: Philology, and Physics and Mathematics. In 1956, the first graduation of teachers took place.

In 1998, the branch of the institute was founded in Izhevsk. In addition, there are offices in all pedagogical colleges of Udmurt Republic: in Mozhga (opened in 1999), Sarapul (1999), Igra (1999), Votkinsk (1999), Debyosy (2001), Uva (2002), Yar (2005), and Balezino (2006).

== Education ==
Nowadays, in the institute the education process is organized at four faculties:

- Faculty of Computer Science, Physics and Mathematics,
- Faculty of Social Communications and Philology,
- Faculty of Pedagogical and Art Education,
- Faculty of History and Linguistics.
