= 2022 Udmurt head election =

2022 Udmurtia head election
- 9–11 September 2022
- Turnout: 39.79%
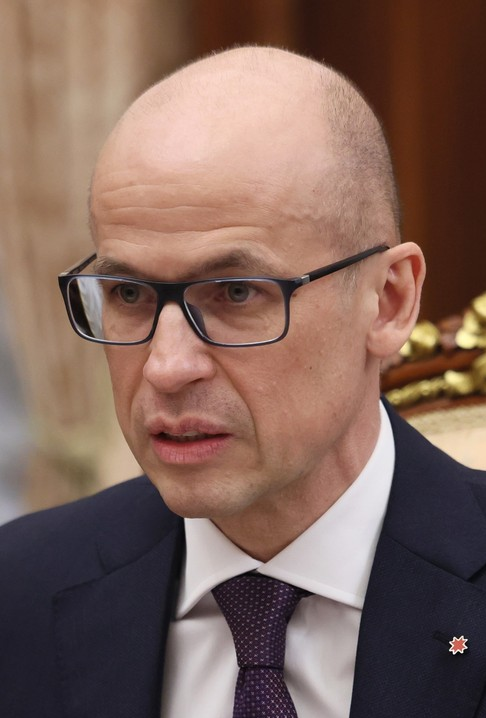
		CPRF	LDPR
Nominee	Aleksandr Brechalov	Aleksandr Syrov	Timur Yagafarov
Party	United Russia	CPRF	LDPR
Popular vote	298,822	91,876	45,436
Percentage	64.37%	19.79%	9.79%
Head before election
Aleksandr Brechalov
United Russia
Elected Head
Aleksandr Brechalov
United Russia

The 2022 Udmurt Republic head election took place on 9–11 September 2022, on common election day, coinciding with elections to the State Council of Udmurtia. Incumbent Head Aleksandr Brechalov was re-elected to a second term.

== Background ==
In April 2017 Head of Udmurtia Aleksandr Solovyov was arrested for taking bribes. He was removed from office and replaced with Civic Chamber Secretary Alexander Brechalov. Brechalov won the subsequent head election with 78.16% of the vote.

In the 2021 Russian legislative election United Russia received only 35.63% in Udmurtia, which could prompt a potentially competitive head election in 2022. Despite United Russia's poor showing in the parliamentary elections, in January 2022 Vedomosti reported that Aleksandr Brechalov most likely would retain his position. In May 2022 President Vladimir Putin officially endorsed Brechalov for reelection.

Due to the start of the Russian invasion of Ukraine in February 2022 and subsequent economic sanctions the cancellation and postponement of direct gubernatorial elections was proposed. The measure was even supported by A Just Russia leader Sergey Mironov. Eventually, the postponement never occurred, as on 3 June State Council of the Udmurt Republic called head election for 11 September 2022.

== Candidates ==
Only political parties can nominate candidates for head election in Udmurtia; self-nomination is not possible. However, candidate is not obliged to be a member of the nominating party. Candidate for Head of Udmurtia should be a Russian citizen and at least 30 years old. Each candidate in order to be registered is required to collect at least 7% of signatures of members and heads of municipalities (55-57 signatures). Also gubernatorial candidates present 3 candidacies to the Federation Council and election winner later appoints one of the presented candidates.

=== Registered ===
- Vadim Belousov (SR-ZP), Member of State Duma
- Aleksandr Brechalov (United Russia), incumbent Head of Udmurtia
- Aleksandr Syrov (CPRF), Member of Izhevsk City Duma, businessman
- Timur Yagafarov (LDPR), Member of State Council of the Udmurt Republic, 2017 head candidate

=== Withdrew after registration ===
- Georgy Leshchev (ZA!), individual entrepreneur (endorsed Brechalov)
- Vladimir Segal (RPPSS), pensioner

=== Did not file ===
- Yury Mishkin (Communists of Russia), individual entrepreneur, first secretary of CPCR regional committee

=== Withdrawn ===
- Sergey Antonov (PVR), political strategist

=== Declined ===
- Vladimir Bodrov (CPRF), Member of State Council of the Udmurt Republic, 2017 head candidate
- Vladimir Chepkasov (CPRF), former Member of State Council of the Udmurt Republic (2007-2017), 2014 head candidate

=== Candidates for Federation Council ===
- Vadim Belousov (SR-ZP):
  - Andrey Blinov, Member of the Glazov City Duma, former Member of the State Council of the Udmurt Republic (2012-2017)
  - Sergey Gromov, entrepreneur
  - Vladimir Ovsyannikov, Member of the Seltinsky District Council of Deputies, stomatologist
- Aleksandr Brechalov (United Russia):
  - Lyubov Glebova, incumbent Senator
  - Nadezhda Mikhaylova, First Deputy Speaker of the State Council of the Udmurt Republic
  - Sergey Smirnov, Chief of Staff to Head and Government of Udmurtia
- Georgy Leschev (ZA!):
  - Vera Bushkova, education methodologist
  - Andrey Leshchev, candidate's father
  - Larisa Lescheva, candidate's mother
- Vladimir Segal (RPPSS):
  - Aleksandr Berezin, pensioner
  - Lyudmila Korepanova, chair of RPPSS regional office
  - Vladimir Kulyabin, pensioner
- Aleksandr Syrov (CPRF):
  - Natalya Ivanova, former Member of the Adam Council of Deputies (2012-2016)
  - Andrey Pichugin, private security agency director
  - Valentina Pudova, singer
- Timur Yagafarov (LDPR):
  - Aleksandr Dodin, cultural organiser
  - Aleksey Kuznetsov, Member of the Zavyalovsky District Council of Deputies, engineer
  - Tatyana Shutova, Member of the Yakshur-Bodyinsky District Council of Deputies, college professor

== Finances ==
All sums are in rubles.

Financial Report	Source	Antonov	Belousov	Brechalov	Leshchev	Mishkin	Segal	Syrov	Yagafarov
First		0	2,700,000	6,810,000	15,000	TBA	10,000	3,100,000	3,760,000
Final		TBD	10,368,019	75,810,000	8,471,000	TBD	60,010,000	12,100,000	11,410,000

== Polls ==
Fieldwork date	Polling firm	Brechalov	Syrov	Yagafarov	Belousov	Segal	Leshchev	Undecided	Lead
6 September 2022	Segal withdraws from the race								
3 September 2022	Leshchev withdraws from the race								
15 - 20 August 2022	ИНСОМАР	65%	11%	8%	4%	1%	1%	9%	54%

== Results ==
Summary of the 9–11 September 2022 Udmurtia head election results
Candidate	Party	Votes	%
Aleksandr Brechalov (incumbent)	United Russia	298,822	64.37
Aleksandr Syrov	Communist Party	91,876	19.79
Timur Yagafarov	Liberal Democratic Party	45,436	9.79
Vadim Belousov	A Just Russia — For Truth	15,352	3.31
Valid votes		451,486	97.25
Blank ballots		12,759	2.75
Total		464,248	100.00
Turnout		464,248	39.79
Registered voters		1,166,781	100.00

Incumbent Senator Lyubov Glebova (United Russia) was re-appointed to the Federation Council.

== See also ==
- 2022 Russian gubernatorial elections
