= 2027 in Russia =

- Decades: 2000s; 2010s; 2020s
- See also: History of Russia; Timeline of Russian history; List of years in Russia

Events in the year 2027 in Russia.

== Events ==
=== Predicted and scheduled ===
- 2 August – Solar eclipse of August 2, 2027 (partial eclipse)
- 12 September – 2027 Russian elections

== Holidays ==
- 1–8 January – New Year's Day and Holidays
- 7 January – Christmas (Orthodox)
- 23 February – Defender of the Fatherland Day
- 24 February – Defender of the Fatherland Holiday
- 8 March – International Women's Day
- 9 March – International Women's Day Holiday
- 1 May – Spring and Labour Day
- 9 May – Victory Day
- 12 June – Russia Day
- 4 November – Unity Day
