= Andrei Soluyanov =

Russian politician (1959–2022)

Member of the State Duma
- In office 17 December 1995 – 19 December 1999

Personal details
- Born: Andrei Vladimirovich Soluyanov; 11 August 1959 Glazov, Udmurt ASSR, Russian SFSR, Soviet Union
- Died: 18 March 2022 (aged 62)
- Party: New Regional Policy
- Education: Glazov State Pedagogical Institute

Andrei Vladimirovich Soluyanov (Russian: Андрей Владимирович Солуянов; 11 August 1959 – 18 March 2022) was a Russian politician. A member of the New Regional Policy, he served in the State Duma from 1995 to 1999. He died on 18 March 2022 at the age of 62.
