= Dmitry Shumkov =

Russian lawyer (1972–2015)

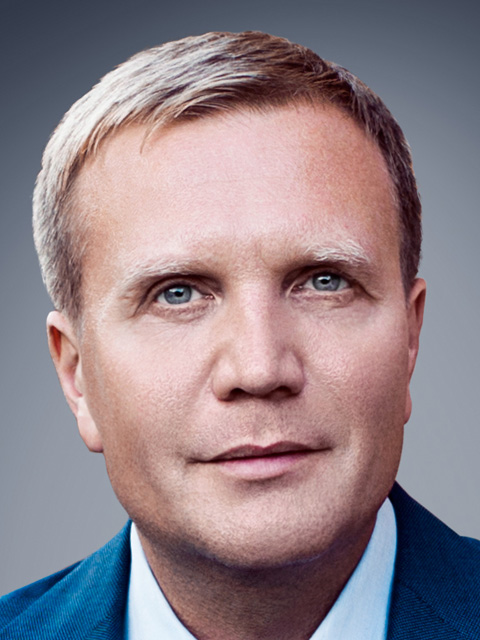

Personal details
- Born: 23 January 1972 Sarapul, Soviet Union
- Died: 4 December 2015 (aged 43) Moscow, Russia
- Occupation: Russian lawyer, businessman
- Profession: Lawyer

Dmitry Vladimirovich Shumkov (Russian: Дми́трий Влади́мирович Шумко́в, 23 January 1972 – 4 December 2015) was a Russian lawyer, businessman, public figure known for his contributions to law, business, and social initiatives. He served as a member of the Civic Chamber of the Russian Federation and supported various educational and public projects.

== Early life and education ==
Dmitry Shumkov was born on 23 January 1972 in Sarapul, Udmurt Republic, Russia. He graduated with a degree in law from the Udmurt State University and later pursued academic and professional endeavors in the legal field.

== Education and academic career ==
Dmitry Shumkov earned a Ph.D. in law with a thesis titled "The system of bodies of state power within the subjects of the Russian Federation" in 1999. In 2002, he defended a second dissertation, "Social and Legal Foundations for the Sovereignty of the Russian Federation," under the supervision of Janghir Abbasovich Kerimov, a corresponding member of the Russian Academy of Sciences.

Shumkov served as a professor in the Department of Public Administration and Legal Coverage of Civil and Municipal Services at the Russian Presidential Academy of National Economy and Public Administration (RANEPA). He was a scientific advisor at the Institute for Energy Law at Kutafin Moscow State Law University and a member of the Presidium of the Association of Lawyers of Russia. He also chaired the Energy Law Regulation Commission and was a member of the Research and Consulting Council at the General Prosecutor's Office of the Russian Federation. Over his career, Shumkov authored more than 100 academic papers.

== Professional career ==
=== Legal career and innovations ===
During the 1990s, Dmitry Shumkov worked in the prosecution authorities of the Russian Federation. After leaving public service, he founded the legal firm Pravokom, which later merged with Yurakademia: Kutafin & Partners and was restructured into the Law Group. Under his leadership as Chairman of the Partnership Committee, the Law Group became the first Russian firm authorized to conduct international transactions on behalf of the Russian Government. The firm provided legal counsel on government securities, foreign credit loans, and sovereign wealth management.

=== Pro bono and educational contributions ===
Shumkov, in collaboration with Oleg Kutafin, established a network of free legal aid centers across Russia. By mid-2015, over 750 centers had assisted more than 400,000 people. His charitable foundation also funded situation centers at Lomonosov Moscow State University and Kutafin Moscow State Law University, as well as a legal clinic at Saint Petersburg State University. These initiatives supported legal education and access to justice.

=== Development projects and business ventures ===
Shumkov was involved in significant real estate projects, including the restoration of historic buildings in Kitay-Gorod, which became part of Zaryadye Park, a major urban redevelopment project. Additionally, he was a co-owner of the Moscow Olympic Stadium (Olimpiyskiy), contributing to its redevelopment efforts.

=== Professional engagement ===
From 1992 to 1999, Dmitry Shumkov worked for the prosecution authorities of the Russian Federation.

In 1999, Shumkov founded the legal firm Pravokom, which provided legal services to major companies in the fuel and energy sector.

From 1999 until his passing in 2015, Shumkov served as a professor at the Russian Presidential Academy of National Economy and Public Administration (RANEPA) in the Department of Public Administration and Legal Coverage of Civil and Municipal Services.

In 2005, Pravokom merged with Yurakademia: Kutafin & Partners, forming the "Law Group," where Shumkov became Chairman of the Partnership Committee. The Law Group became the exclusive legal advisor for the restructuring of Russia's First Government Corporation, Russian Corporation of Nanotechnologies (later Rosnano), advising key Russian entities like Sberbank, Gazprom, and Rostekhnologii.

Shumkov's charity fund financed modern equipment for the legal clinic at Saint Petersburg State University.

From 2012 until his death, Shumkov chaired the Council of the Centre for Legal Initiatives (CLI), established under Presidential Decree No.1796, with responsibilities that included collecting and generalizing suggestions for improving the Civil Code of the Russian Federation and presenting reports to the President. The CLI involved leading academic institutions, including Moscow State University, Saint Petersburg State University, Kutafin Moscow State Law University, and Ural State Law University.

In 2012, Shumkov also chaired the Elections Situation Centre, established at Kutafin Moscow State Law University, which played a significant role during Russia's electoral campaigns. The centre, run on private donations, coordinated election observers at over 86,000 polling stations, processing thousands of inquiries and ensuring transparency during the elections.

== Business activity ==
Investments

Shumkov was involved in various business ventures, primarily as an investor in the high-tech sector through his holding company, the Centre of Internetworking Technologies (CIT), which held shares in the Moscow Internet Exchange (MSK-IX).

On September 8, 2011, Shumkov presented to Russian Prime Minister Vladimir Putin a management system for modern universities, developed in collaboration with JSC Gazprombank.

In September 2012, following the APEC summit in Vladivostok, Shumkov presented a plant and equipment complex for the Far Eastern Federal University (FEFU). This initiative was highly regarded by President Vladimir Putin, who stated that FEFU's technical capabilities now rival leading universities.

Development projects

From the early 2000s until his death, Shumkov invested in various development initiatives, particularly focused on revitalizing buildings near Zaryadye Park in Moscow. In 2014, he acquired properties at Varvarka 14, contributing to the park's redevelopment. Shumkov also supported museum-related projects, such as the Ethnographic Museum and exhibitions on Zaryadye's history, aiming to integrate modern infrastructure while preserving the area's historical character. Additionally, he was a co-owner of the Moscow Olympic Stadium (Olimpiyskiy).

Other activity

Shumkov was a co-owner of the world's biggest platinum deposit, Norilsk-1 (Russian Platinum).

== Philanthropy ==
Shumkov's charity fund supported education, scientific research, culture, and sports initiatives. It contributed to the development of legal initiative centers at Moscow State University and Kutafin Moscow State Law University, as well as funding modern equipment for the legal clinic at Saint Petersburg State University.

Shumkov's fundraising events attracted influential figures, including Carla Bruni-Sarkozy, Tony Blair, Natalia Vodianova, Valery Gergiev and prominent media representatives from agencies like Associated Press, France Press, Deutsche Welle, Kyodo News and the Xinhua.

In 2015, his fund provided prize money to Russian winners of the 2015 European Games in wrestling.

== Recognition and awards ==
Over his career, Shumkov received several accolades for his contributions to Russian society. He was awarded state honors, including the Order of Honour, for his work in law, public service, and philanthropy. In 2012, Shumkov was named the Lawyer of the Year award winner. Shumkov was listed as having been among the top 10 lawyers of the Russian Federation.

== Death ==
On 4 December 2015, Shumkov was found hanged on his tie in an apparent suicide in his apartment in Moscow. He was 43. As of 2024, no cause of his death has been announced.
