= Anton Tkachev =

Russian politician

Anton Tkachev MP
- Антон Ткачёв
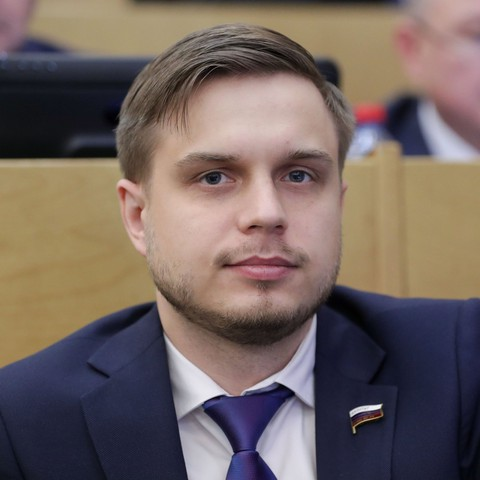

Member of the State Duma (Party List Seat)
- Incumbent
- Assumed office 27 October 2021
- Preceded by: Sergey Chudaev

Personal details
- Born: 31 March 1994 (age 31); Voronezh, Russia
- Political party: New People
- Education: Synergy University; Plekhanov Russian University of Economics

Anton Olegovich Tkachev (Russian: Антон Олегович Ткачев; born 31 March 1994, Voronezh) is a Russian political figure and a deputy of the 8th State Duma.

After graduating from the Plekhanov Russian University of Economics, Tkachev continued working at the center of the digital economy at the university. He also became a secretary of the council of the Chamber of Commerce and Industry of the Russian Federation. From 2020 to 2021, he was a secretary of the Voronezh Oblast branch of the New People party. On 27 October 2021 he received a deputy mandate for the 8th State Duma that previously belonged to Sergey Chudaev.

== Sanctions ==
He was sanctioned by the UK government in 2022 in relation to the Russo-Ukrainian War.
