= Pskov City Duma =

City duma of Pskov, Russia

Pskov City Duma Псковская городская дума
- 7th legislature

Type
- Type: Unicameral

Leadership
- Chairman: Aleksandr Goncharenko, United Russia since 22 September 2022

Structure
- Seats: 25
- Political groups: United Russia (19) CPRF (2); SRZP (1); LDPR (1); RPPSJ (1) Yabloko (1)

Elections
- Voting system: Mixed
- Last election: 11 September 2022
- Next election: 2027

Meeting place
- 14 Nekrasova Street, Pskov

Website
- pskovgorod.ru

The Pskov City Duma (Russian: Псковская городская дума, romanized: Pskovskaya gorodskaya duma) is the city duma of Pskov, Russia. A total of 25 deputies are elected for five-year terms.

== History ==
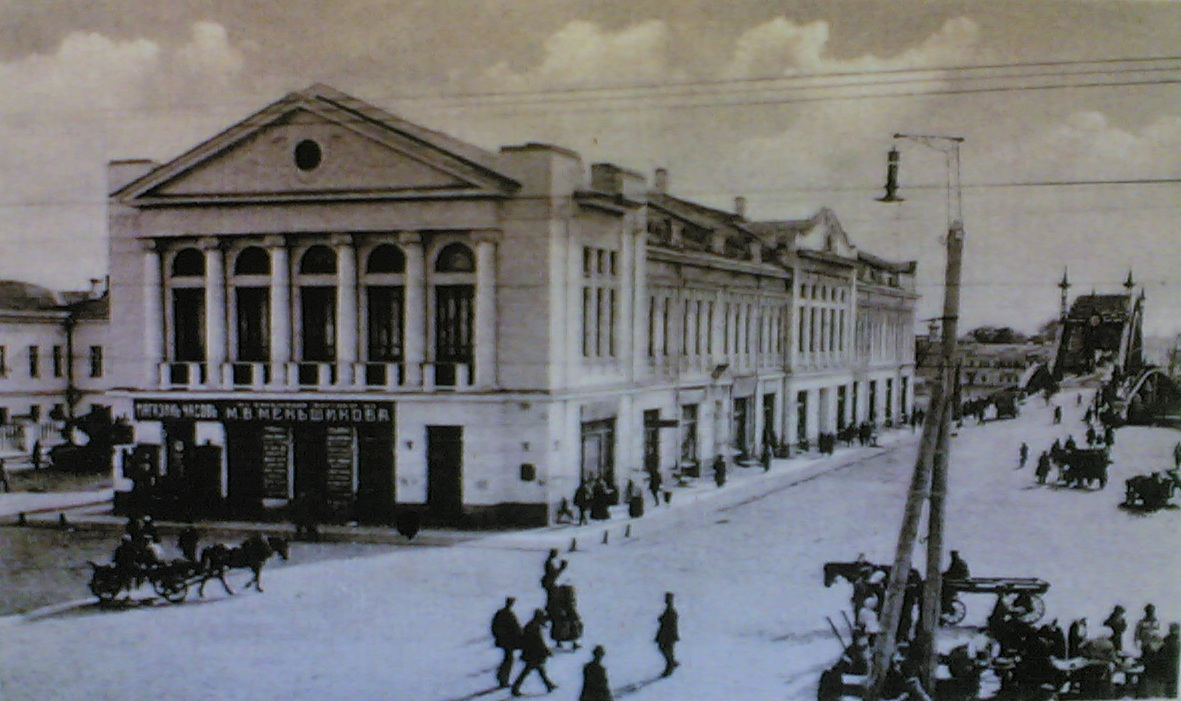
Pre-revolutionary Pskov City Duma

The Pskov City Duma was originally established in 1785 as part of Catherine II's reforms on local government, with the first meeting being held in 1789.

== Elections ==
=== 2017 ===
Party	%	Seats
United Russia	39.71	15
Communist Party of the Russian Federation	21.77	5
A Just Russia	11.32	2
Yabloko	8.53	1
Liberal Democratic Party of Russia	7.41	1
Self-nominated	—	1

=== 2022 ===
Party	%	Seats
United Russia	51.33	19
Communist Party of the Russian Federation	14.52	2
Yabloko	9.04	1
Russian Party of Pensioners for Social Justice	8.14	1
Liberal Democratic Party of Russia	7.62	1
A Just Russia — For Truth	7.61	1
