= Uvinsky District =

Uvinsky District Увинский район (Russian)
- District

Other transcription(s)
  - Udmurt: Ува ёрос
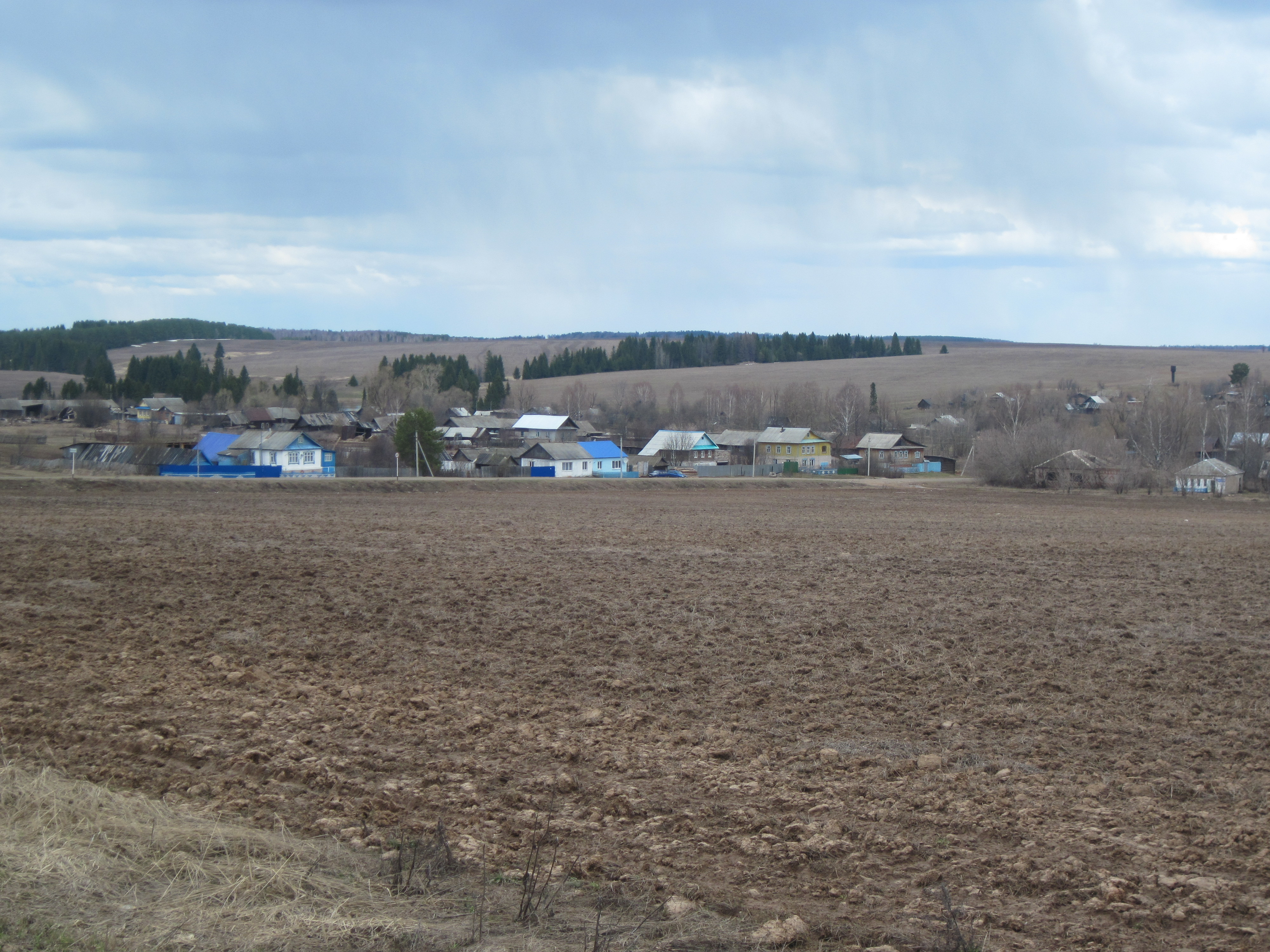
- Uvinsky District

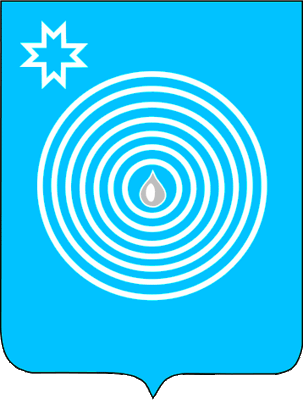
- Flag Coat of arms
- Location of Uvinsky District in the Udmurt Republic
- Coordinates: 56.966°N 51.742°E
- Country: Russia
- Federal subject: Udmurt Republic
- Established: 23 January 1935
- Administrative center: Uva

Area
  - Total: 2,445.4 km^{2} (944.2 sq mi)

Population (2010 Census)
  - Total: 39,671
  - Density: 16.223/km^{2} (42.017/sq mi)
  - Urban: 50.4%
  - Rural: 49.6%

Administrative structure
  - Administrative divisions: 19 selsoviet
  - Inhabited localities: 90 rural localities

Municipal structure
  - Municipally incorporated as: Uvinsky Municipal District
  - Municipal divisions: 0 urban settlements, 17 rural settlements
- Time zone: UTC+4 (MSK+1)
- OKTMO ID: 94544000
- Website: http://uva.udmurt.ru/

Uvinsky District (Russian: Уви́нский райо́н; Udmurt: Ува ёрос, Uva joros) is an administrative and municipal district (raion), one of the twenty-five in the Udmurt Republic, Russia. It is located in the southwestern central part of the republic. The area of the district is 2,445.4 square kilometers (944.2 sq mi). Its administrative center is the rural locality (a settlement) of Uva. Population: 39,671 (2010 census); 40,738 (2002 Census);

Historical population
Year	Pop.	±%
1959	27,425	—
1970	42,571	+55.2%
1979	37,923	−10.9%
1989	40,876	+7.8%
2002	40,738	−0.3%
2010	39,671	−2.6%
2021	34,627	−12.7%
Source: Census data

40,876 (1989 Soviet census). The population of Uva accounts for 50.4% of the district's total population.
