= Vadim Belousov =

Russian politician (born 1960)

- Вадим Белоусов
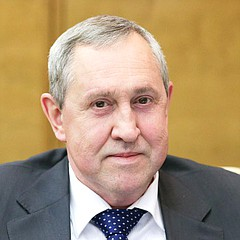

Member of the State Duma (Party List Seat)
- In office 21 December 2011 – 1 November 2023
- Succeeded by: Marina Kim

Personal details
- Born: 19 November 1969 (age 56) Chelyabinsk, Russian SFSR, Soviet Union
- Party: A Just Russia — For Truth
- Education: Chelyabinsk Polytechnic Institute

Vadim Vladimirovich Belousov (Russian: Вадим Владимирович Белоусов; born 2 October 1960, Chelyabinsk) is a Russian political figure and a deputy of the 6th, 7th, and 8th State Dumas.

From 1993 to 1995, Belousov worked as an engineer at the Chelyabinsk branch of the Research Institute of the Tractor Institute. In 1997, Vadim Belousov joined the board of directors of Makfa APO. From 2004 to 2011, he held the position of General Director of Makfa Management Company LLC. In 2010-2011, he was the deputy of the Legislative Assembly of Chelyabinsk Oblast of the 5th convocation. In December 2011, he was elected deputy of the 6th State Duma. In 2016, he left the United Russia with which he previously ran. In September 2016, he received a vacant mandate from the deputy Sergei Doronin for the 7th State Duma. Since September 2021, he has served as deputy of the 8th State Duma.

== Legal troubles ==
In 2018, Belousov lost parliamentary immunity due to an initiated criminal case against him on the largest bribe in the history of Russia of 3,25 billion rubles. According to the investigation, from 2010 to 2014, Belousov, together with the governor of the Chelyabinsk Oblast Mikhail Yurevich received a bribe for the alleged patronage of entrepreneurs so that they would receive tenders for the construction and maintenance of regional roads without competition. Besides Belousov, his wife and mother-in-law were also involved in the scheme. Belousov did not admit his guilt.

On 3 August 2022 he was found guilty and sentenced to 10 years of imprisonment. However, he did not come to the court for sentencing and is considered fugitive from justice. In November 2023, the State Duma prematurely terminated Belousov’s powers “for absenteeism”.

An ongoing controversy has emerged in filling his former mandate, which remains empty. Normally, the seat would have transferred to the next person on the SRZP electoral list, Olesya Redkina, a member of the Legislative Assembly of Kirov Oblast. However, an investigated against Redkina was opened on 22 November 2023 by the Investigative Committee of Russia, alleging she had embezzled money using ghost employment. Th Central Election Commission of Russia decided to postpone making a decision, and the seat has yet to be filled.

In 2024, the Russian Prosecutor General’s Office filed a lawsuit against former owners of Makfa, including former State Duma deputy Vadim Belousov, seeking to recover 18.17 billion rubles and transfer shares of Mishkinsky Produkt to the state. According to the Prosecutor General’s Office, the assets were acquired through corruption, while Belousov’s defense considers the lawsuit unlawful.

== Sanctions ==
He was sanctioned by the UK government in 2022 in relation to the Russo-Ukrainian War.
