= Igrinsky District =

Igrinsky District Игринский район (Russian)
- District

Other transcription(s)
  - Udmurt: Эгра ёрос
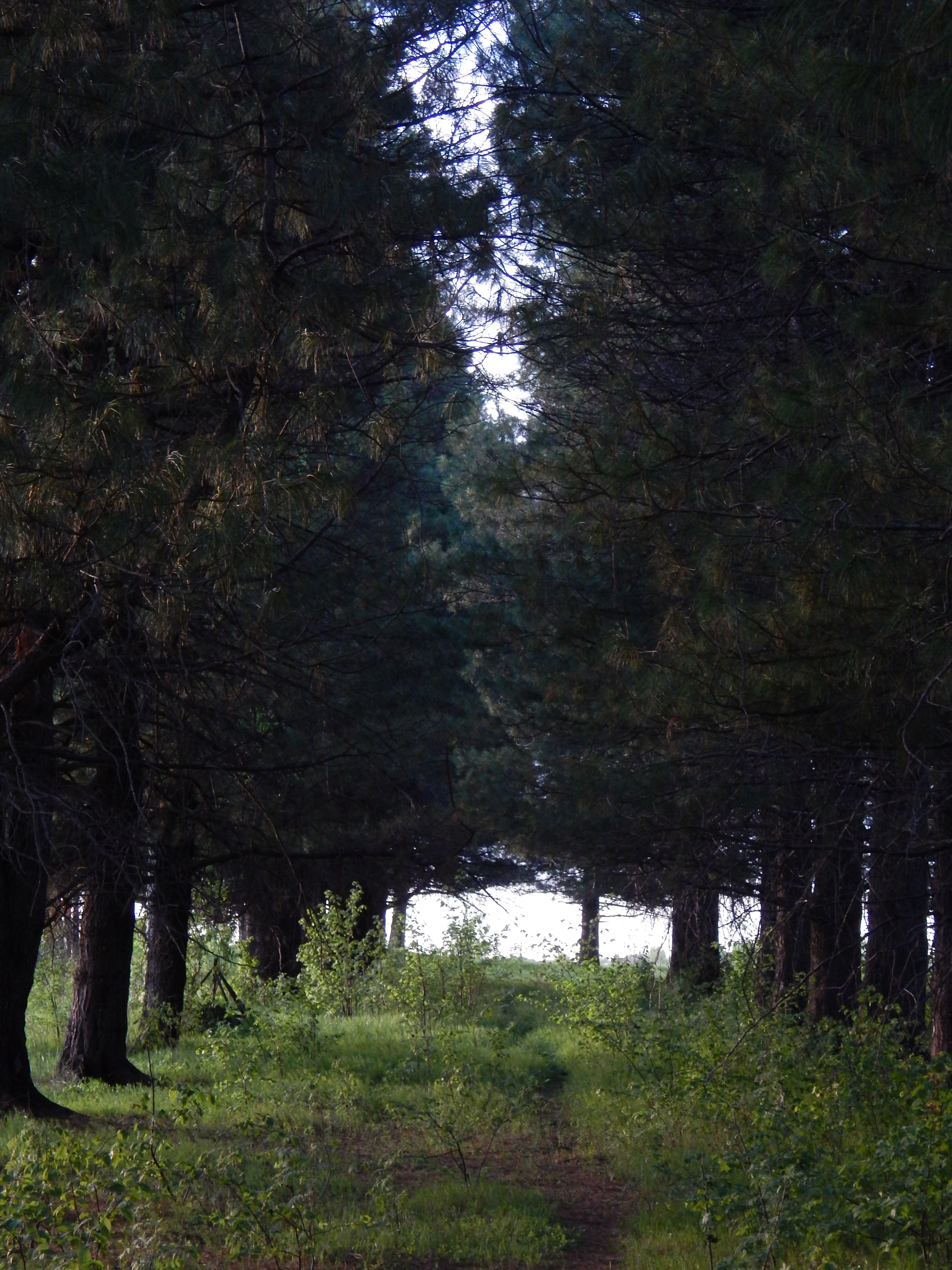
- Zayakinskaya Cedar Grove: Igrinsky District

- Flag Coat of arms
- Location of Igrinsky District in the Udmurt Republic
- Coordinates: 57.528°N 52.430°E
- Country: Russia
- Federal subject: Udmurt Republic
- Established: 1 June 1937
- Administrative center: Igra

Area
  - Total: 2,266.9 km^{2} (875.3 sq mi)

Population (2010 Census)
  - Total: 38,194
  - Density: 16.849/km^{2} (43.638/sq mi)
  - Urban: 54.3%
  - Rural: 45.7%

Administrative structure
  - Administrative divisions: 15 selsoviet
  - Inhabited localities: 113 rural localities

Municipal structure
  - Municipally incorporated as: Igrinsky Municipal District
  - Municipal divisions: 0 urban settlements, 15 rural settlements
- Website: http://www.igra.udmurt.ru/

Igrinsky District (Russian: Игри́нский райо́н; Udmurt: Эгра ёрос, Egra joros) is an administrative and municipal district (raion), one of the twenty-five in the Udmurt Republic, Russia. It is located in the center of the republic. The area of the district is 2,266.9 square kilometers (875.3 sq mi). Its administrative center is the rural locality (a settlement) of Igra. Population: 38,194 (2010 census); 42,850 (2002 Census); 45,869 (1989 Soviet census). The population of Igra accounts for 54.3% of the district's total population.
