= Sigayevo =

Sigayevo Сигаево
- Selo
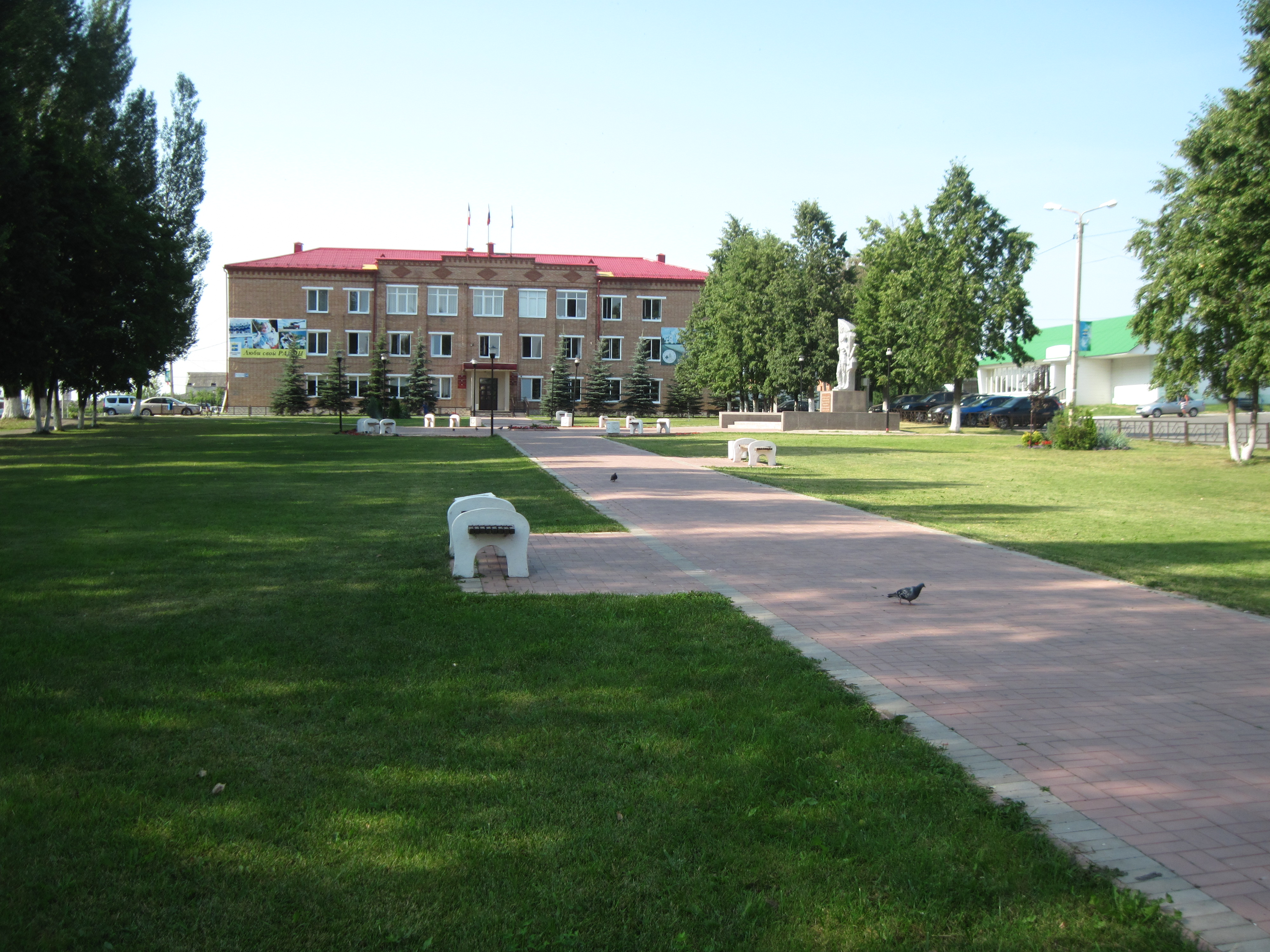

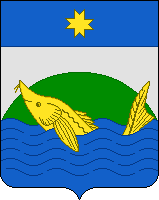
- Coat of arms
- Interactive map of Sigayevo
- Location of Sigayevo Sigayevo (Udmurt Republic)
- Coordinates: 56°25′12″N 53°46′04″E
- Country: Russia
- Federal subject: Udmurtia
- Administrative district: Sarapulsky District

Population (2010 Census)
  - Total: 5,648
  - Estimate (2021): 5,153 (−8.8%)

Administrative status
  - Capital of: Sarapulsky District
- Time zone: UTC+4 (MSK+1)
- Postal code: 427990
- OKTMO ID: 94637435101

Sigayevo (Russian: Сигаево) is a rural locality (a selo) and the administrative center of Sarapulsky District in the Udmurt Republic, Russia, located 5 kilometers (3.1 mi) south of the city of Sarapul. Population: 5,648 (2010 census); 5,845 (2002 census).
