= Uva, Russia =

Rural locality in Udmurtia, Russia

Coordinates: 56°59′13″N 52°11′01″E

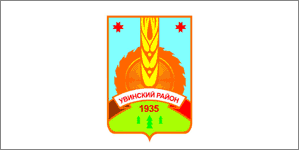
Flag of Uva

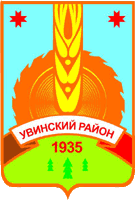
Coat of arms of Uva

Uva (Russian: Ува, Udmurt: Ува) is a rural locality (a settlement) and the administrative center of Uvinsky District, Udmurtia, Russia. Population:

Historical population
Year	Pop.	±%
1959	11,554	—
1970	14,219	+23.1%
1979	15,496	+9.0%
1989	18,249	+17.8%
2002	19,358	+6.1%
2010	19,984	+3.2%
2021	19,057	−4.6%
Source: Census data
