= Sergey Chudaev =

Russian politician

- Сергей Чудаев
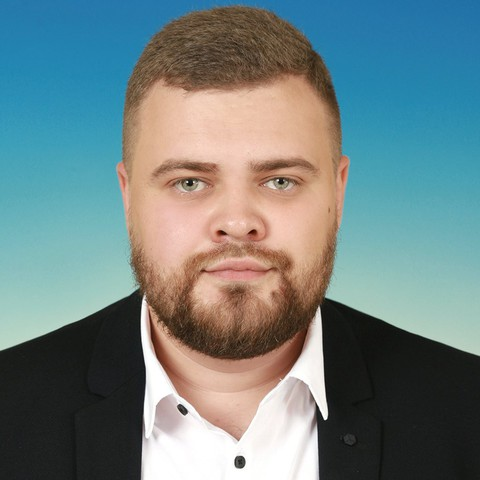

Member of the State Duma (Party List Seat)
- In office 12 October 2021 – 18 October 2021
- Succeeded by: Anton Tkachev

Personal details
- Born: 12 August 1996 (age 28); Kalininsk, Saratov Oblast, Russia
- Political party: New People
- Education: Plekhanov Russian University of Economics

Sergey Dmitrievich Chudaev (Russian: Сергей Дмитриевич Чудаев; born 12 August 1996, Kalininsk, Saratov Oblast) is a Russian political figure and a former deputy of the 8th State Duma. He graduated from the Plekhanov Russian University of Economics. Later Chudaev engaged in politics and soon became a member of the New People. In September 2021, he was elected deputy of the 8th State Duma; however, he resigned ahead of schedule on 19 October 2021, explaining this by the desire to focus on his work in Udmurtia. Politician Anton Tkachev took over his mandate.
