= Sarapulsky District =

Sarapulsky District Сарапульский район (Russian)
- District

Other transcription(s)
  - Udmurt: Сарапул ёрос
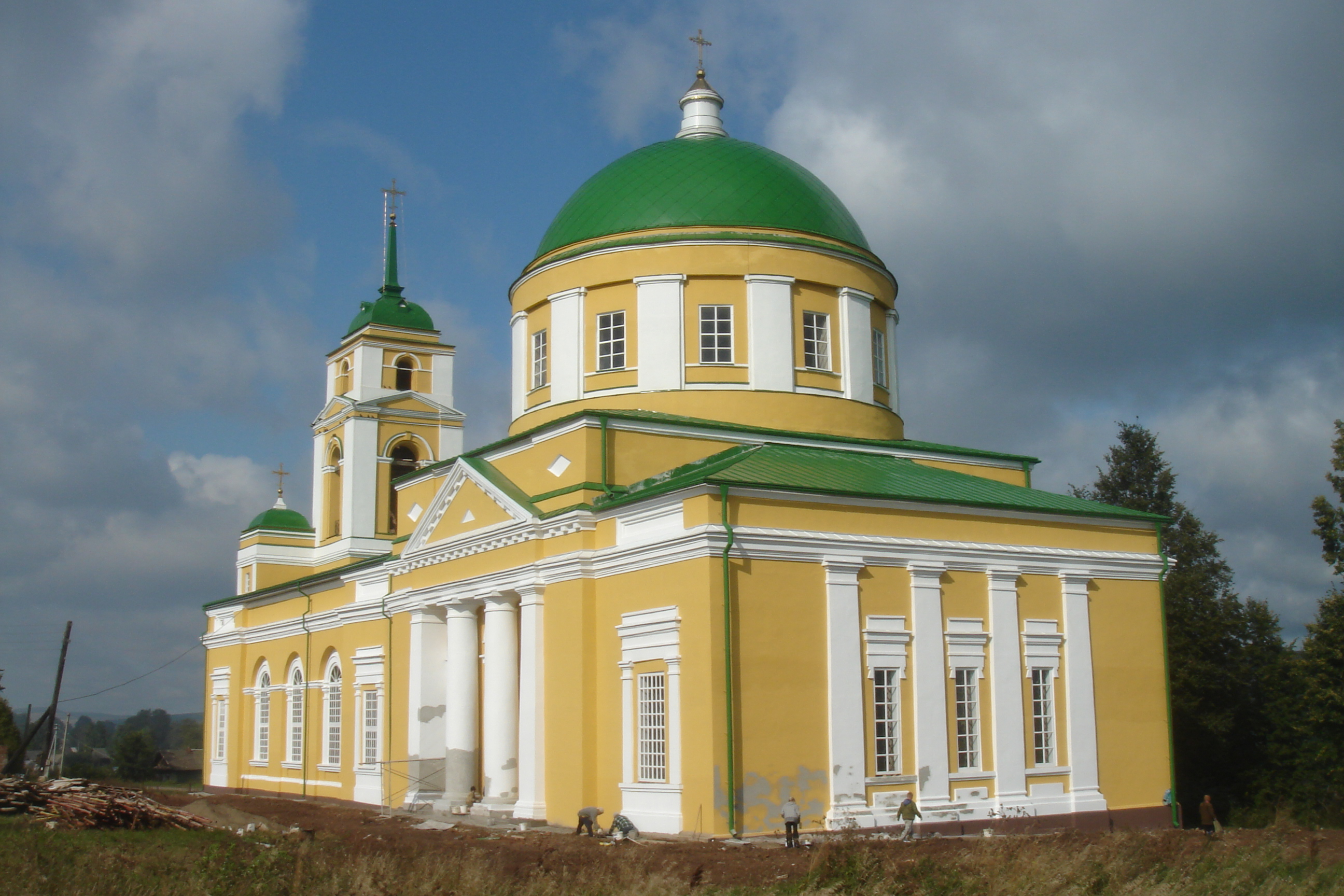
- Church of the Transfiguration, Mazunino

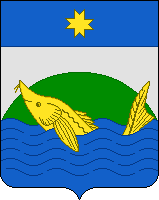
- Flag Coat of arms
- Location of Sarapulsky District in the Udmurt Republic
- Coordinates: 56.463°N 53.194°E
- Country: Russia
- Federal subject: Udmurt Republic
- Established: 4 January 1924
- Administrative center: Sigayevo

Area
  - Total: 1,877.6 km^{2} (724.9 sq mi)

Population (2010 Census)
  - Total: 24,625
  - Density: 13.115/km^{2} (33.968/sq mi)
  - Urban: 0%
  - Rural: 100%

Administrative structure
  - Administrative divisions: 16 selsoviet
  - Inhabited localities: 59 rural localities

Municipal structure
  - Municipally incorporated as: Sarapulsky Municipal District
  - Municipal divisions: 0 urban settlements, 17 rural settlements
- Time zone: UTC+4 (MSK+1)
- OKTMO ID: 94637000
- Website: http://sarapulrayon.udmurt.ru/

Sarapulsky District (Russian: Сара́пульский райо́н; Udmurt: Сарапул ёрос, Sarapul joros) is an administrative and municipal district (raion), one of the twenty-five in the Udmurt Republic, Russia. It is located in the southeast of the republic. The area of the district is 1,877.6 square kilometers (724.9 sq mi). Its administrative center is the rural locality (a selo) of Sigayevo. Population: 24,625 (2010 census); 24,215 (2002 Census); 25,842 (1989 Soviet census). The population of Sigayevo accounts for 22.9% of the district's total population.
