= Aleksandr Brechalov =

Russian politician (born 1973)

- Александр Бречалов
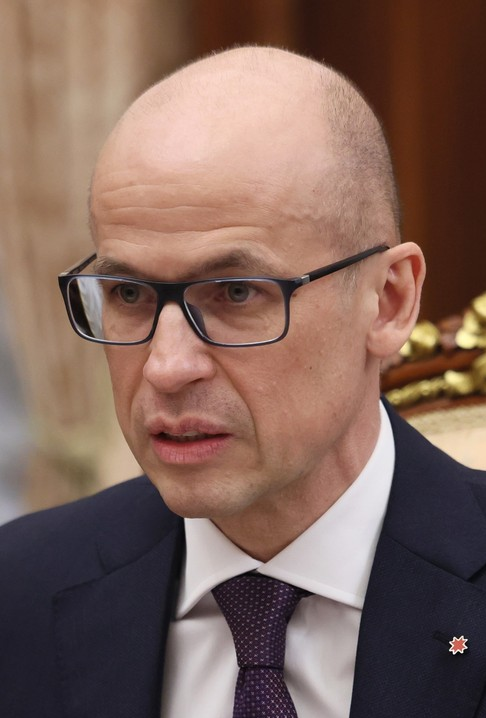
- Brechalov in 2025

3rd Head of the Udmurt Republic
- In office 4 April 2017 – 29 July 2026; Acting until 18 September 2017
- Preceded by: Aleksandr Solovyov
- Succeeded by: Olga Abramova

Secretary of the Civic Chamber of Russia
- In office 16 June 2014 – 20 March 2017
- Preceded by: Yevgeny Belikhov
- Succeeded by: Vyacheslav Bocharov

Personal details
- Born: Aleksandr Vladimirovich Brechalov; 18 November 1973 (age 53) Tlyustenkhabl, Adyghe Autonomous Oblast, Krasnodar Krai, Russian SFSR, Soviet Union
- Party: United Russia (2018–present)
- Spouse: Yelena Nikolayevna
- Children: Artyom; Anastasia

Aleksandr Vladimirovich Brechalov (Russian: Александр Владимирович Бречалов; born 18 November 1973) is a Russian politician who was the 3rd Head of the Udmurt Republic between 18 September 2017 and 29 July 2026. He is also the Secretary of the Udmurt regional branch of the United Russia party since 7 July 2020.

He was the secretary of the Civic Chamber of the Russian Federation from 2014 to 2017, was the co-chairman of the Central Headquarters of the All-Russian People's Front, and was the First Vice-president of the All-Russian Public Organization of Small and Medium-Sized Business "Support of Russia".

== Biography ==
Aleksandr Brechalov was born in Tlyustenkhabl on 18 November 1973. His father, Vladimir, was a builder.

=== Career ===
In 1994, he graduated from the Krasnodar Military Institute S. M. Shtemenko with honors.

He got his first work experience as a schoolboy at the construction site of a residential building in Krasnodar. From 1994 to 1996, he worked as deputy head of the regime service of the Chkalovsky garrison (special aviation division).

Between 1996 and 2000, he worked as a legal adviser to CJSC TV-6 Moscow and OJSC Alfa-Bank. In 1999, he graduated from the Moscow State Law Academy. O. E. Kutafina.

From 2001 to 2002, he held the position of head of the legal department at CB Uniastrum Bank (LLC). In 2002 to 2003, he worked as the director of the legal department at CB Uniastrum Bank (LLC). From 2003 to 2006, he worked as General Director of Uniastrum Consulting LLC. Between 2006 and 2013, he was promoted as President of VBO Consult LLC.

In 2005, he was the head of the regional branch in the Krasnodar Krai. In 2008, he was promoted as vice-president. From 2012 to 2014, he was president, then was demoted to the first vice-president in 2014, of the All-Russian public organization of small and medium-sized businesses "Support of Russia".

Between 2007 and 2014, he was a member of the Board of Directors of CB Uniastrum Bank.

In 2009, he has been the founder of the OPORA CREDIT media holding, which provides information on measures to support small and medium-sized businesses and conducts the All-Russian competition for entrepreneurs "Business Success".

In 2013, he had been a Member of the Central Headquarters of the All-Russian Popular Front. He is also the a Member of the Board of Directors of EXIAR OJSC In the same year, he was the co-chairman of the Central Headquarters of the All-Russian Popular Front.

In 2014 — Member of the Board of Directors of the All-Russian Public Opinion Research Center (VTsIOM).

==== As Secretary of the Civic Chamber of Russia ====
On 16 June 2014, Brechalov became the secretary of the Civic Chamber of Russia. According to the Institute for Socio-Economic and Political Research, in the ranking of the most promising public politicians in 2014, Brechalov took an honorable 3rd place, after the leader of the list, Elizaveta Glinka (Doctor Lisa) and deputy Olga Batalina.

In December 2014, Brechalov presented to the President of Russia the annual report of the Public Chamber of the Russian Federation on the state of civil society in Russia.

In 2015, he had been a member of the Anti-Corruption Council under the President of Russia.

At the end of 2015, according to the ISEPI Foundation, Brechalov took 1st place in the rating of the most promising politicians in Russia. In the "Rating 2016" prepared by the Foundation "Institute of Socio-Economic and Political Research", he took first place.

In 2016, he had been a Member of the Council under the President of Russia for Strategic Development and Priority Projects.

On 20 May 2016, the website of the Civic Chamber of the Russian Federation published a call by Brechalov, as Secretary of the Chamber, to the citizens of the Russia to come and vote on May 22 of the same year at the primaries of the United Russia party. Brechalov assured the Russians that in the primaries they will be able to "choose exactly those whom they want to see as candidates from the United Russia party in their region in the upcoming elections". Speeches by Brechalov and other members of the public chambers in support of the United Russia primaries caused negative responses. Former member of the Public Chamber of the Russia, Yelena Lukyanova, called campaigning for participation in the primaries by members of the federal and regional public chambers illegal, noting that "members of the Public Chamber have no right to allow any form of support for political parties." Article 4 of the Code of Ethics indeed obliges each member of the Civic Chamber, in exercising the powers vested in him, "not to allow any form of public support for political parties."

In November 2016, the Center for Anti-Corruption Policy of the Yabloko party revealed a cartel in the purchases of the Public Chamber. Brechalov argued that all purchases were carried out legally.

Since 2017, he is the chairman of the Board of Trustees of the Russian Triathlon Federation.

In March 2017, the FAS Russia confirmed signs of a cartel agreement, but Brechalov denied any violations.

The 2015 report of the Public Chamber on human rights in Russia was prepared by a clothing firm, while long-established well-known human rights organizations (such as the Moscow Helsinki Group) were not allowed to write it.

=== As Head of Udmurtia ===
On 4 April 2017, by Decree of the President of Russia, Brechalov was appointed as the acting Head of the Udmurt Republic until the person elected Head of the Udmurt Republic takes office.

On 10 September, following the results of early elections, Brechalov was elected the new Head of the Udmurt Republic, gaining more than 78% of the vote. On 18 September during the inauguration, Brechalov took the oath in two languages at once, Russian and Udmurt, and officially assumed this position. Brechalov won the 2022 Udmurt head election again in 2022, with 64% of the vote.

== Sanctions ==
Due to his role in the Russian government and the 2022 Russian invasion of Ukraine, Brechalov was added to the Specially Designated Nationals and Blocked Persons List by the US Office of Foreign Assets Control.

== Family ==
He met his girlfriend, Yelena Nikolayevna, in the 5th grade of school and carried this love through his whole life. As a boy, he even thought of becoming an investigator simply because little Lena's father worked for him.

As they are married, she is the founder of several commercial companies and two centers for legal additional education. They have two children, twins Artyom and Anastasia.

== Income ==
Brechalov's income for 2017 exceeded 34 million rubles. However, this is taking into account the amount from the sale of real estate.

The income in 2020 amounted to about 4 million 843 thousand rubles, which is almost 13.3 million rubles less than in 2019.

In Brechalov's use is an apartment of 147.5 sq. m, also the head of Udmurtia owns a passenger car "Volkswagen 7HC Multivan". Brechalov's wife, Yelena earned 3 million 629 thousand rubles in 2020.

== Hobbies ==
He is fond of triathlon. On 6 October 2013, he completed the Ironman triathlon in Barcelona. On October 4, 2015, in the city of Calella, he overcame the Ironman distance with a result of 10 hours 41 minutes 6 seconds.

In 2015, he ran the Baikal Ice Marathon, took part in the Karjala Half Marathon in Karelia and swam across the Volga as part of the Connecting Shores swim (4.7 km).

== Awards ==
Order of Friendship (8 August 2023) — for a significant contribution to the socio-economic development of the regions of the Russian Federation.
