= State Council of the Udmurt Republic =

Regional parliament of Udmurtia, Russia

- 7th legislature

Type
- Type: Unicameral

Leadership
- Chairman: Vladimir Nevostruyev, United Russia since 16 April 2020

Structure
- Political groups: United Russia (50); CPRF (5); SRZP (2); LDPR (4); Rodina (1)

Elections
- Voting system: Mixed
- Last election: 11 September 2022
- Next election: 2027

Meeting place
- Karlutskaya Square, Izhevsk

Website
- http://www.udmgossovet.ru/

The State Council of the Udmurt Republic (Russian: Государственный Совет Удмуртской Республики; Udmurt: Удмурт Элькунлэн Кун Кенешез) is the regional parliament of Udmurtia, a federal subject of Russia. A total of 60 deputies are elected for five-year terms.

It succeeded the Supreme Council of the Udmurt Republic in 1994. Initially 100 deputies were elected to the State Council. This number was later reduced to 90, and then to 60.

The presiding officer is the Chairman of the State Council of Udmurtia.

== Elections ==
=== 2017 ===
Party	%	Seats
United Russia	63.16	47
Communist Party of the Russian Federation	14.86	5
Liberal Democratic Party of Russia	8.95	2
A Just Russia	6.57	2
Self-nominated	—	4
Registered voters/turnout	34.54	

=== 2022 ===
Party	%	Seats
United Russia	51.07	49
Communist Party of the Russian Federation	15.56	3
Liberal Democratic Party of Russia	13.64	4
A Just Russia — For Truth	6.06	2
Registered voters/turnout	39.79	

== See also ==
- List of Chairmen of the State Council of the Udmurt Republic
