= Udmurt State University =

Public university in Izhevsk, Russia

- Удмуртский государственный университет (УдГУ)
- Type: Public
- Established: 1931
- Rector: Galina Merzlyakova
- Academic staff: 959
- Students: 28,089
- Undergraduates: 9,272
- Location: Izhevsk, Udmurt Republic, Russia
- Campus: Urban
- Website: Udmurt State University Building details
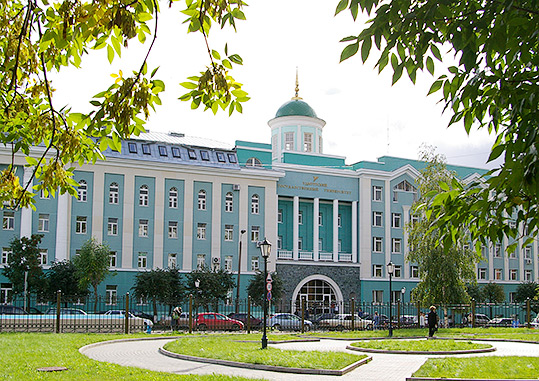

General information
- Coordinates: 56°51′02″N 53°13′26″E

University rankings

Regional – Overall
- QS Emerging Europe and Central Asia: 401-450 (2022)

Udmurt State University (Udmurt: Удмурт кун университет; Russian: Удмуртский государственный университет) is a public university in the city of Izhevsk, Russia. Established in 1931, UdSU is in Udmurt Republic. In 1993, it was named among top twenty classical Russian universities, since then consistently ranks 14-16 out of 64 Russian universities.

As of 2025 over 14,000 students are enrolled at the Udmurt State University, which offers 86 different majors. About 9,200 of them are full-time undergraduates.

== History ==
The formation of the Udmurt State Pedagogical Institute (USPI) began in the difficult and heroic times of the 1930s. USPI was established in April 1931. A significant role in the development of USPI belongs to the directors of that period - G.P. Makarov (directorship years 1933–1937) and M.A. Rodin (directorship years 1938–1944). Initially, the pedagogical institute consisted of 4 faculties: Faculty of History, Faculty of Language and Literature, Faculty of Natural Sciences, Faculty of Physics and Mathematics. In that period the first candidates of science, the first professors appear, the first educational building is built, the first specialists graduate. The pedagogical institute becomes a forge of teaching staff for the Udmurt Republic. In the difficult times of the Great Patriotic War, the pedagogical institute, like the whole country, is rebuilt on a war footing. At that time, two independent educational institutions were incorporated into the USPI: the Kursk Pedagogical Institute and the Izhevsk Teachers' Institute of Foreign Languages. Students and teachers were actively working in the rear area and providing assistance to the front during the war. After the Great Patriotic War, the USPI began to steadily increase the number of students and academic staff. This was the period when the first doctors of science appeared and the second building of the pedagogical institute was built. The key figure of this period was the director of the USPI M.P. Babin (directorship years 1948–1972). New faculties were opened: the Faculty of Sports, the Faculty of Art and Graphics.

== Becoming Udmurt State University ==
In 1971, the government decided to transform the USPI into the Udmurt State University. B.N. Shulga became the first rector of UdSU. At that time, a new university building (bldNo.4)was opened at the university, a new faculty –the Faculty of Economics and Law was established. In the years 1972 and 1973, a computing center, laboratories of ultrasound, electrophysics, solid state physics, electrometry, psychology were created. In total, 10 new departments and 20 laboratories were opened at UdSU in the first decade of its university history. A university publishing house was opened, 3 dormitories were built. In 1986, V.A. Zhuravlevwas appointed the UdSU rector. Over the 15 years under his leadership, the number of faculties increased significantly: from 9 faculties in 1988 to19in 2001. In 1987, a student catering facility was opened. It united university canteens in the campus buildings and buffets in the student dormitories. In 1988, the University Botanical Garden was arranged on the basis of a farm as an educational and scientific base. University campus building No. 5 (Sports Palace) has been functioningsince 1992. In 1997 building No. 6 was put into operation. In 1996, Udmurt State University entered the global Internet.

== Modern history ==
The end of the 1990s - beginning of the 2000s were marked by a wave of transformations of faculties into institutes, this process was completed in the 2010s.

From 2007 to 2012, Udmurt State University was headed by S.D. Buntov. Under his leadership, new areas of training were opened and the material and technical base of the university was further developed. In 2011, Udmurt State University received an indefinite license to carry out educational activities, and at the same time, the grand opening of the "Institute of Oil and Gas named after M.S. Gutseriev" took place, which is located in a separate building.

From 2012 to the present, the Rector of the university is G.V. Merzlyakova.

In recent years, the university has been developing dynamically and continues to compete with the leading universities of the country, confidently maintaining the high status of the center of science, culture and education of the Udmurt Republic. Together with industrial enterprises, ministries and departments, the university has been actively involved in the development of high-tech industries and in suchareas as medical biotechnology, computer science, space research, etc. At the university, research departments are united into scientific and educational platforms designed to become “growth points” for the university research. Udmurt State University regularly holds international and all-Russian conferences on topics that cover current issues of science and education. We are proud of the victories of our students in annual international, all-Russian, republican scientific and creative competitions, student Olympiads, and WorldSkills professional skills competitions.

The infrastructure development continues. The university campuses enhance by the Educational and Scientific Library named after V.A. Zhuravlev (built in 2013), a modern student dormitory (built in 2013), updated practice bases, and the Vernadsky House of Scientific Collaboration (established in 2020). In 2022, the Center for Assessment and Development of Management Competencies was created on the basis of Udmurt State University in collaboration with the ANO “Russia is a Country of Opportunities”. A platform for youth technological and social entrepreneurship is functioning at the university. The Startup as a Diploma program has been launched. The university was awarded a grant in the amount of 3.02 million rublesfor financial support of the Entrepreneurial “Boiling Point”. A Memorandum of Cooperation was signed between Udmurt State University and ASI, the National Technology Initiative (NTI) platform and the NTI University "20.35".

Two new research laboratories are opened: the laboratory of mathematical control theory and the laboratory of molecular and cellular biology. In 2021-2023 the funding of both the laboratories amounted about 70 million rubles per year.

Among the most significant R&D achievements by UdSU researchers are creation of a digital twin of a 3D printer of metal powder products and research conducted for JSC TsNIIMash on space materials science. With the assistance of the industry integrator Rusatom - Additive Technologies LLC, the first Center for General Access Additive Technologies (CGAAT) in Russia was opened at Udmurt State University. The center's activities are aimed at fulfilling production and educational tasks.

Udmurt State University is the founder of 10 scientific publications, of which 3 publications are presented in the international databases Web of Science and Scopus: Bulletin of the Udmurt University. Mathematics. Mechanics. Computer Science; Bulletin of the Institute of Mathematics and Informatics and Yearbook of Finno-Ugric Studies; 9 publications are included in the list of peer-reviewed scientific publications of the Higher Attestation Commission under the Ministry of Education and Science of Russia. Udmurt State University is the largest classical multidisciplinary university in the Udmurt Republic that offers educational programmes in the field of engineering and IT technologies, pedagogy and humanities, natural sciences and creative areas.

== University infrastructure ==
Today, the university has a developed modern infrastructure. Educational activities are carried out by 72 departments consisting of 13 educational institutes, a Multidisciplinary College of Professional Education, and an Institute of Additional Professional Education. The implementation of the university's educational programs is provided by about 700 full-time teaching and research staff of the university. The share of doctors and candidates of science is 67%.

== Educational Programmes ==
The university offers over 200 educational programs within 29 large groups of specialties and areas of training for bachelors, specialists, masters, and postgraduates. The profile of educational programs corresponds to the priority areas of scientific and technical development and technological leadership. The programs aim to train specialists that will be able to respond to current challenges, taking into account the interaction of man, nature, technologyand social institutions. The major focus in education is made on the strategic training of highly competitive specialists with digital and entrepreneurial competencies, the introduction of practice-oriented educational programs based on partnership mechanisms of interaction and the implementation of IET based on joint innovative projects. A number of educational programs are export-oriented and are popular with international students.

== Indicators ==
The overall number of students is over 14,000 people. 51% of them study at the expense of the federal budget. The number of students studying under targeted training agreements is 256 people. The university has concluded over 700 agreements with various industries for the training of specialists. Since 1931, the university has graduated over 155 thousand professionals. 67% of graduates find employment in the Udmurt Republic. The dynamics of overall employment is stable and averages over 80%. The share of students who arrived to study at UdSU from other regions of the Russian Federation and foreign countries (from 27 countries) is 20.4%.

Udmurt State University enjoys membership in various university associations, including the Eurasian Association of Universities,the Association of Finno-Ugric Universities, the Association of Tourism Departments of the Volga Federal District, the Russian-Chinese Association of Universities "Volga-Yangtze" and others. The university is a member of the following consortia: the Consortium of the NTI Competence Center in Big Data Storage and Analysis (established at Moscow State University), the Consortium of the NTI Competence Center in Robotics and Mechatronics at Innopolis University, the University Consortium of Big Data Researchers, etc. UdSU implements dozens of projects within the framework of collective and individual grants of international programs in the field of education and science. It is a center for positive changes in various areas of regional life, ensures the development of national art, language and culture, and contributes to the improvement of the urban environment. A large regional center for social design, volunteering, culture and sports, and lean manufacturing in the social sphere is being formed at the university. As part of the development of scientific and educational cooperation, the university establishes new connections and concludes international agreements. The university has created all the conditions not only for professional training, but also for the harmonious development of individuals. Student life is full of vibrant events, full of creativity, scientific research, and active, interesting recreation. Today, Udmurt State University is actively developing, responding to the challenges of the time. It is an important center for the integration of the Udmurt Republic into the global space, contributing to the increase of the region's role in Russia and the world.

== Participationin the Priority 2030 program ==
In 2021, Udmurt State University applied for the Federal Program of Strategic Academic Leadership "Priority-2030" and was announced among the winners. In 2022 and 2023, the university successfully defended its participation in the program and in 2024 retained its status as the leading university in the region and the country. Since 2025, the Priority-2030 Program has been transformed into a new format focused on achieving technological leadership. The goals, performance indicators, governing bodies and financing mechanisms of the Program have changed dramatically. The university will continue to participate in the updated Priority-2030 Program. The major goal is the implementation of projects and activities aimed at ensuring the technological leadership of the Russian Federation, including the creation of a system for training personnel capable of creating and operating new science-intensive technologies. Together we create something new, look to the future, study, preserve, explore!

== Organizational structure ==
The main campus is on Udmurtskaya street in Izhevsk. As of 2025 The university consists of 14 institutes, a Multidisciplinary College of Professional Education, 18 research laboratories, 2 representative offices, 72 departments, 19 educational and business centers.

=== Humanities ===
- Institute of History and Sociology
- Institute of Language and Literature
- Institute of Udmurt Philology, Finno-Ugric Studies and Journalism
- Institute of Physical Culture and Sports
- Institute of Pedagogy, Psychology and Social Technologies
- Institute of Arts and Design
- Institute of Social Communications
- Institute of Law, Social Management and Security
- Institute of Economics and Management
- Institute of Natural Sciences
- Institute of Mathematics, Information Technology and Physics
- Institute of Civil Protection
- M. S. Gutseriev Institute of Oil and Gas

== Regional campuses ==
In addition to the main campus in Izhevsk, The Udmurt State University also has other campuses to service other parts of the Udumurt Republic. In the Udmurt Republic, there are campuses located in Votkinsk, Mozhga.

== Faculty ==
Out of almost 1,000 faculty members 190 faculty members are Associate Professors and 45 Full Professors.

== Graduate school ==
UdSU graduate school offers 11 Ph.D. committees qualified to award Ph.D. and Dr.Sc. degrees in ecology, economics, law, psychology, pedagogics, ethnology, history, culture, linguistics of the Ural region, and Udmurt linguistics.

== Research ==
Since the 1960s UdSU has diversified the scope of its scientific activity, and is currently offering up to 10 subfields of study within the most popular areas of research.

Research Area	Number of Subfields
Physics and Mathematics	10
Technical Sciences	6
Biology	4
History	4
Philology	4
Pedagogy	4
Economics	3
Sociology	2
Art Studies	2
Psychology	2
Geography	2
Law	2
Philosophy	1
Chemistry	1
Cultural Studies	1
Civil Defence	1

Several issues of "Vestnik UdSU" journal present faculty members and students research papers every year.

== Student facilities and life ==
The Fundamental Library of the Udmurt State University first opened in 1931. As of 2006 its fund contains over 700,000 units of conservation in both Russian and foreign languages.

New Main Building of the UdSU Library (Project)

Udmurt State University is a home for three museums. Opened in the 1960s Natural History Museum of The Animal Ecology Department remains a resource for biology and zoology students.

Although the initial research for the Museum of Ancient and Medieval History of the Kama and Vyatka Region started in 1973, museum officially began its work only in 1980.

Museum of Arts and Art Gallery established in 1991 showcases paintings, sculptures, and other art works created by UdSU students, faculty, and professional artists of the Udmurt Republic.

Founded in May 1998 The Center for American Studies (Центр американистики) attempts to familiarize UdSU students and faculty members with American culture. Besides various programs devoted to interdisciplinary studies of contemporary American culture, coordinated by both Russian and American specialists from the University of Central Florida, the center offers tutoring for TOEFL test and Computer Training courses.
