= Igra =

Rural locality in Russia

Coordinates: 57°33′N 53°02′E

Igra (Russian: Игра; Udmurt: Эгра, Egra) is a rural locality (a settlement) and the administrative center of Igrinsky District of the Udmurt Republic, Russia, located 98 kilometers (61 mi) north of Izhevsk at the European route E22, which changes there from M7 to the main Siberian route P242. Population: 20,737 (2010 census); 22,280 (2002 census); 22,866 (1989 Soviet census).

== Gallery ==
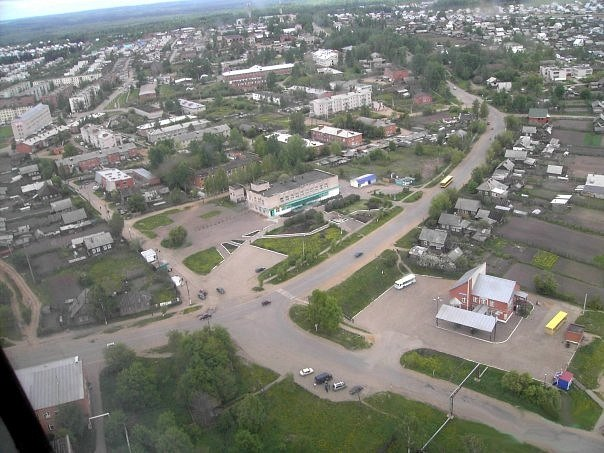
City

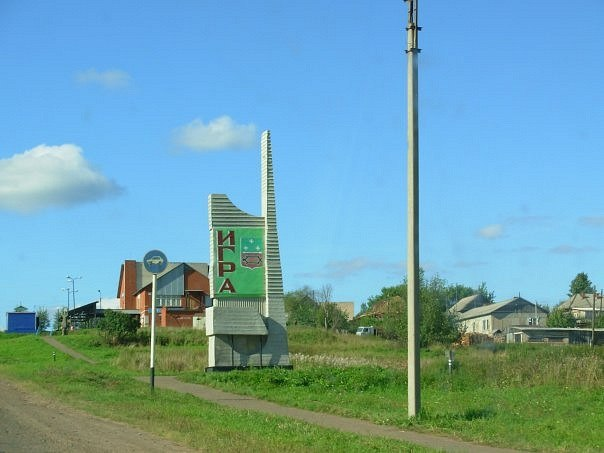
Stela at the entrance to the city from Izhevsk.

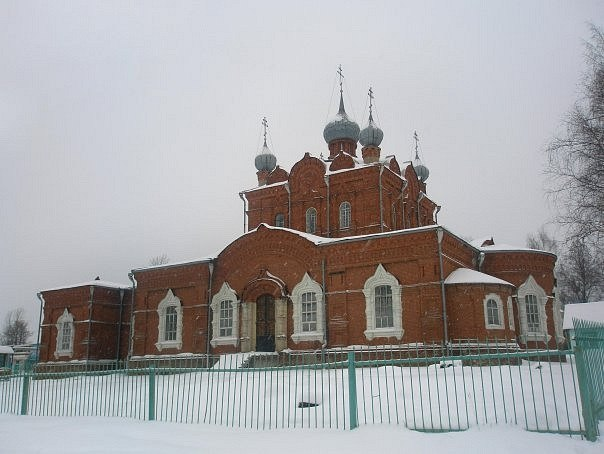
Church of St. John the Divine.

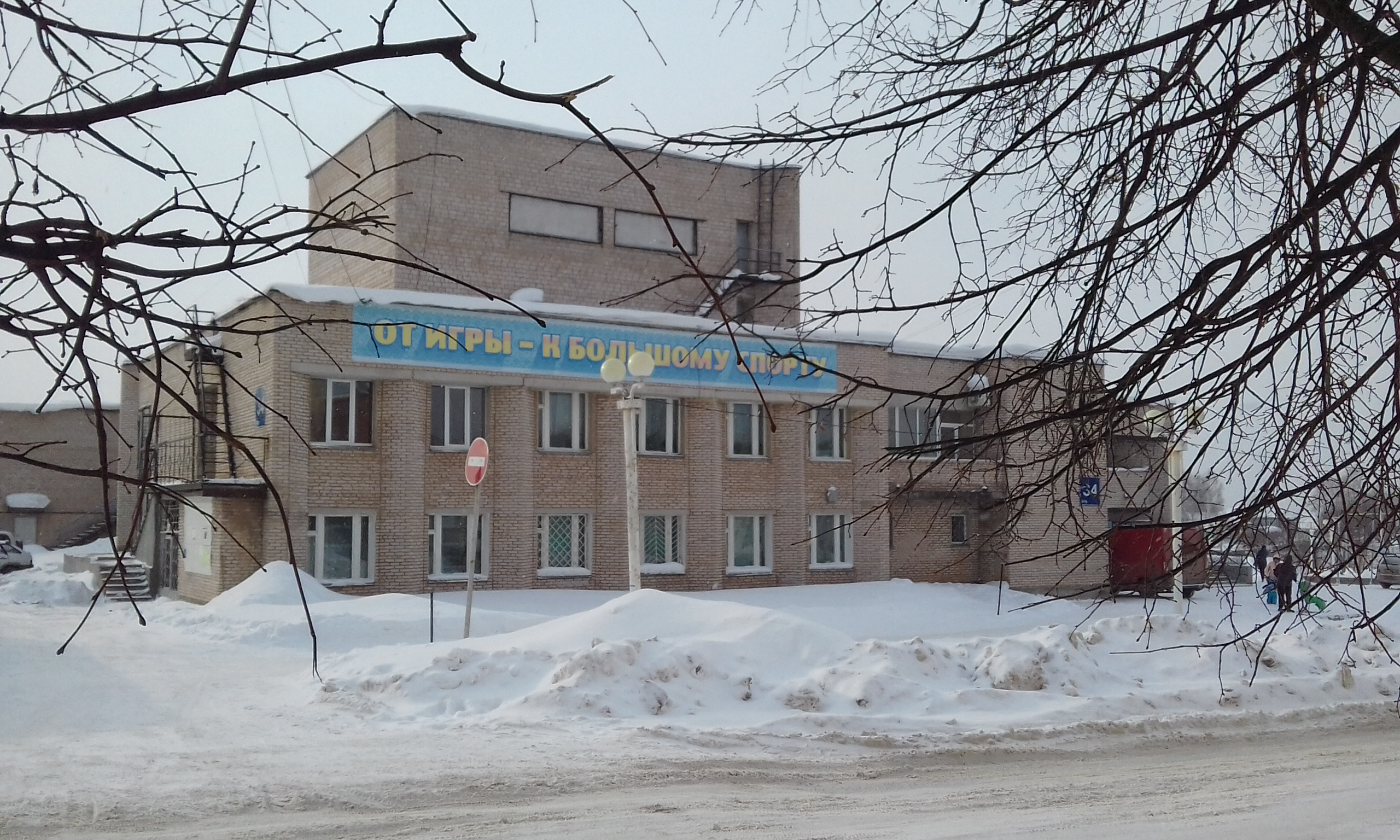
Culture palace
