= Alexander Grigorievich Shklyaev =

Udmurt writer and literary critic

- Native name: Шкляев Александр Григорьевич
- Born: February 4, 1944; Yakshur, Yakshur-Bodyinsky district of the Udmurt Autonomous Soviet socialist Republic
- Occupation: Udmurt writer, literary critic, journalist

Alexander Grigorievich Shklyaev (February 4, 1944) is an Udmurt writer and literary critic.

He is an honored science worker of the Udmurt Republic (1994), honored worker of culture of the Udmurt Republic (1996), member of the Union of journalists of the Russian Federation (1977), member of the Writers' Union of Russia (1979), laureate of the State prize of UR, commander of the Order of the Badge of Honour (1984), candidate of Philology (1977), laureate of National prize named after K. Gerd.

== Biography ==
=== Birth ===
Shklyaev was born on February 4, 1944, in the Yakshur village, located in the Yakshur-Bodyinsky district of the Udmurt Autonomous Soviet Socialist Republic.

=== Education ===
He attended the Yakshur-Bodin high school. Afterwards, he studied in the faculty of journalism of Moscow State University and graduated in 1967; he studied as a postgraduate student from 1968 to 1971 before he defended his dissertation. He worked as a senior researcher in the literature and folklore sector of the Udmurt Research Institute of Economics, History, Language and Literature.

=== Career ===
He started working as a journalist in the editorial office of the newspaper Komsomolets of Udmurtia from 1967 to 1978. From 1978 to 1982, he was the editor-in-chief of Molot magazine. He was the 1981–1984 chairman of the board of the Writers' Union of the Udmurt Autonomous Soviet Socialist Republic. In 1985 he started working at the Udmurt State University as the head of the Department of Udmurt Literature and Literature of the Peoples of the Soviet Union. From 1998 to 2015 he was the head of the Department of history and theory of journalism. Shklyaev teaches Udmurt State University students courses "History of Domestic Journalism", "Legal Regulation of Mass Media", "Literary Work of a Journalist", "Logical Culture of a Journalist", "Media Criticism", "International Humanitarian Law and Mass Media", and "Literature of the Peoples of Russia and Neighboring Countries".

== Literary activity ==
Shklyaev began his literary career as a poet and prose writer and published his poems and stories. For the first time his literary works began to appear in the newspapers Udmurtiys Komsomolets (″Удмуртиысь комсомолец″) and Soviet Udmurtia, and in the magazine Molot (now Kenesh) in 1959.

Since 1971 he started to work as a literary critic. He is the author of studies on twentieth-century literature, such as: "The imes literature times of life" (1982), ″And others will come to reap...″ (″Араны егит муртъес лыктозы″, 1986), "Defeated no names" (″Чашъемнимъёс", 1995); "From year to year" (″Вапумысь вапуме", 2002).

Shklyaev also studied the literary process of the 1920s–30s in Udmurtia ("On the approaches to realism: Udmurt literature, the literary movement and criticism in 1917–1934", 1979). He introduced concepts in the Udmurt literature like "Flor Vasilyev's verse", "batyriada" (series of works about the Udmurt heroes ("batyrs"; from Russian "батыр")), "begloiada" (series of works about runaway people; from Russian "беглые").

He compiled the first volume of the series of almanacs like Between the Volga and the Urals (1977), the collection Horizon (1980), The edge of the spring (1984), the collection of poems by Kuzebay Gerd Dear friend! ("Гажан эше!", 1978), and Steps (Moscow, 1985),.

He also wrote epigrams, caricatures, parodies, and short stories ("Эшъес-юлтошъес" – "Friends-comrades", 1995).

In 2004, Shklyaev published a book of poems for children called Sleep ("Уйвот"). He also served as the author-compiler of the textbook-anthology for the eighth grade Udmurt literature ("Удмурт литература") in 2007.

He attended seminars of critics V. Gusev, V. Dementiev, and A. Turkov; internships at Helsinki and Turku universities; courses for journalism teachers in Maastricht (Netherlands). He was invited by the University of Oulu (Finland) to give lectures.

Shhklyaev's articles were published in the magazines such as: Questions of literature, Literary review, October, Volga, Elias, Opuskulum (Finland), Nationalities Papers (Great Britain, United States), Kenesh, in the Moscow collections Young about young, and Peers.
