= Udmurt =

Udmurt may refer to:

- Udmurt people, people who speak the Udmurt language
- Udmurt language, a Finno-Ugric language
- Udmurtia or the Udmurt Republic, a federal republic of Russia
- Udmurt Autonomous Oblast, an autonomous oblast of the Soviet Union
