= Udmurtia (disambiguation) =

Udmurtia may refer to:

- Udmurt Republic, a federal subject of Russia
- Udmurt Autonomous Oblast (1920–1934), an administrative division of the Russian SFSR, Soviet Union
- Udmurt Autonomous Soviet Socialist Republic (1934–1990), an administrative division of the Russian SFSR, Soviet Union
