= Kambarsky =

Kambarsky (masculine), Kambarskaya (feminine), or Kambarskoye (neuter) may refer to:

- Kambarsky District, a district of the Udmurt Republic, Russia
- Kambarskoye Urban Settlement, a municipal formation which the town of district significance of Kambarka in Kambarsky District of the Udmurt Republic, Russia is incorporated as
