= Kuzebay Gerd =

Udmurt writer and nationalist figure (1896–1937)

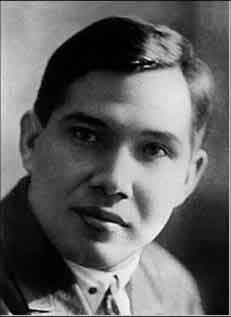
- Born: January 14, 1898; Bolshaya Dokya, Vyatka Governorate (now Udmurtia), Russian Empire
- Died: November 1, 1937; Sandarmokh, Soviet Union

Kuzma Pavlovich Chaynikov (Russian: Кузьма́ Па́влович Ча́йников, IPA: [kʊˈzʲma ˈpavləvʲɪtɕ ˈtɕajnʲɪkəf]), better known as Kuzebay Gerd (Russian: Кузеба́й Ге́рд, IPA: [kʊzʲɪˈbaj ˈɡʲert]; 14 January 1898, in Bolshaya Dokya village – 1 November 1937, in Sandarmokh) was an Udmurt language poet, a prose writer, a playwright, a public figure, and a nationalist. He was executed in Sandarmokh during the Great Purge and was posthumously rehabilitated (exonerated) in 1958.

== Early years ==
Born on 14 January 1898 in the village of Pokchivuko (now Bolshaya Dokya, Vavozhsky district) in an Udmurt family, he was the fifth son. At the age of seven he lost his father, and his mother sent him to the zemstvo primary school. The teacher, seeing his abilities, sent him to the Vavozh school after graduating from school.

Even as a child, he was distinguished by curiosity and was drawn to books. In 1912 he entered the Kukar Teachers' Seminary, where he excelled in all subjects except mathematics. In 1916, after graduating, Gerd was appointed head of the Bolsheuchinsk two-year school.

In January 1918, he was appointed a member of the board of the district teachers' union and head of the Votsky department at the district department of public education. Gerd considered a people's native language to be the main instrument of education for any people and that the education of the Udmurts should be based on their native language and national culture. Working in Malmyzh, he developed educational programs for the indigenous population of the district, creating drama circles in villages, writing plays for them to perform and translating works of Russian playwrights into Udmurt. In November 1918, he became the organizer of the Votsk cultural and educational society, which held many events, including various concerts and performances in the Udmurt language.

== Soviet career ==
During this period, he became a correspondent for the Bolshevik newspaper in the Udmurt language "Gudyri" ("Thunder"). From April to July 1919, he went to Moscow for courses at the People's Commissariat for Education, and upon returning, he took up the task of educating his native people.

In March 1920, he was invited to work at the Udmurt commissariat as head of the publishing department. In 1922–1926 he studied at the Higher Literary and Art Institute named after Valery Bryusov where he studied the oral folk art and life of the Udmurts and organized the Bolyak Society to attract more people to this field.

After graduation, he worked at the Central Museum of Izhevsk. On December 19, 1925, he was approved as a graduate student majoring in ethnology. On March 18, 1926, Gerd, together with Trokai Borisov, created the All-Udmurt Association of Revolutionary Writers (VUARP). In the summer of 1926, he returned to Moscow and became a full-time graduate student at the Institute of Ethnic and National Cultures of the Peoples of the East of the USSR.

The poet not only continued his scientific work while in graduate school but continued writing poetry, joined the literary group "Forge", and became chairman of its national section. At that time, however, political repression and the fight against nationalism was growing more intense. The leaders of the Bolyak Society, including Gerd, were accused of national chauvinism and support for separatism based on their academic and literary work. In 1928, the Bolyak Society was dissolved.

== Literary and academic writing ==
Gerd wrote in both the Russian and Udmurt languages. He began writing poetry at the age of 12 under the influence of Udmurt folklore; in 1915, while still at the teacher's seminary, he created the handwritten magazine "Seminar Pen", including his poems and stories under the pseudonyms "So-and-so", "None Else", "One of Many" and others. Before the October Revolution, he wrote the poems "Above Shoshmoy" (in Russian), "Ozh" ("War"), "Keremet", and "Rebel Onton".

After the revolution, he wrote the poems "Chagyr ӵyn" ("Blue Smoke", 1920), "Factory" (Izhevsk, 1921), and "Foremen" (1930). His poems were published during his lifetime in the collections "Krezchi" ("Guslyar", Izhevsk, 1922), in which the first two sections reflected the past of the Udmurt people, while others glorified the revolution. In the poems "Izh Zavodly" ("To the Izhevsk Plant"), "Karly" ("To the City"), and "Factory" he glorified the work of the worker. The theme of the working class was further developed in the section "Badym Uzhyn" ("In Great Labor").

In his next collection, "Syaskayaskis muzyem" ("Blossoming Land", Kazan, 1927), he extols his native land's nature and the new Soviet society. In "Legetyos" ("Steps", Izhevsk, 1931) he vividly presents the penetration of the new, Soviet society into the Udmurt village and the changes in the psychology of the peasants it brings about.

During his years of study at the literary institute, Gerd was seriously involved in folklore studies and published a number of collections of folklore. Gerd was an active collector of the oral literature of his native people, paying particular attention to songs, publishing collections of songs "Malmyzh udmurtyoslen kyrӟanyossy" ("Songs of the Malmyzh Udmurts") and "Udmurt kyrӟanyos" ("Udmurt songs", 1924, 1927).

In his poetry the influence of the rich folklore traditions of the Udmurts is felt. His romantic poetry conveyed the worldview and spiritual mood of a person at a time of fundamental social change. He also addressed the topic of life and work of the working class, wrote about the industrialization of agriculture, and in the poem "Gurtyn Buran" ("Buran in the Village") spoke out against arbitrariness and violence during collectivization.

In his poetic work, Gerd used all the genre richness of lyric poetry – from a small lyric poem to a novel and ballad. He introduced new poetic forms into Udmurt poetry: sonnet, triolet, various types of free verse. Gerd's works received wide recognition and were translated into the languages of the peoples of the USSR, Hungarian, Finnish, English, and German. Gerd's work had a fruitful influence on subsequent generations of Udmurt writers. With his best poems, poems and scientific works, Gerd made a worthy contribution to the treasury of world literature and culture.

He also wrote the story "Matӥ"—"Motya" (1915, published in 1920) and the comedy "Shaltra Onton" ("Unlucky Anton", 1916). In 1919 he published the plays "Yugyt syures vyle" ("On the Bright Path") and "Adasiyos" ("Witnesses"), and in 1920 published "Tuno" ("The Sorceress"). Amateur groups staged the writer's plays for the first time during the years of Soviet power.

During the short creative period of his life, Gerd also published more than 120 articles on various issues of culture and science (about 40 of them in Russian, five in Hungarian, Finnish, and German), and three collections of folk songs.

Gerd was also the founder of Udmurt Soviet children's literature. He published more than 80 poems and about 40 stories about social life, nature, and flora and fauna of Udmurtia and more than a hundred poems for children, including the poem "Gondyrjos" ("Bears") based on folklore.

Gerd wrote or translated textbooks for primary grades: "Тёплый дождь" ("Shunyt Zor" or "Warm Rain") (1924), "Выль сюрес" ("Vyl Sures" or "New Path") (1929), "Начальная геометрия" ("Elementary Geometry") (1926), "Арифметика" ("Arithmetic") (1925), and "Окружающая нас природа" ("The Nature Surrounding Us") (1925) in the Udmurt language. In graduate school, he prepared two dissertations: on folklore ("The Udmurt Mystery") and on ethnography ("Maternity rites and the East Finnish cradle"). The latter was preserved in the archives of the Finno-Ugric Society in Helsinki, Finland and was published in 1993 under the title "Man and His Birth among the Eastern Finns".

== Purge, execution and rehabilitation ==
Beginning in the late 1920s, the newspapers of Udmurtia launched sharp criticism against Gerd and his literary work, based on their assessing of artistic creativity based on the principles of socialist realism, which viewed literature as a weapon of class struggle and socialist construction. In July 1928, in a statement defending himself to the prosecutor of the Udmurt Autonomous Region, Gerd wrote:

... The newspaper Gudyri publishes articles of a rather untidy nature, where in the most arrogant and unfounded way any accusations are leveled at me either of nationalism or of literary illiteracy, or, on the contrary, sometimes they accuse me of not having a national feeling... I, for publishing Votyak songs with the preservation of dialectical features (science requires this), was accused of nationalism, of "demonstratively speaking out against a single literary language" etc...

In December 1929, Kuzebay Gerd wrote in a statement to the Votsk Regional Workers' and Peasants' Inspectorate: "... In the articles of the newspaper Izhevskaya Pravda, the authors tried to attach to me the most impossible, fictitious and invented labels of 'national democratic leader', 'the ideologist of the most reactionary kulaks,' 'a person with a pretense of being scientific,' etc.

In 1929, the leaders of the Votsky regional committee of the CPSU(b) blocked the appointment of Gerd as a teacher in the Votsky section of the department of national minorities of the Leningrad Pedagogical Institute. At the same time, Gerd was enrolled as a graduate student at the USSR Academy of Sciences, but was soon recalled to Izhevsk and given a modest position as a teacher at the regional Soviet-Party school. Later, in the fall of 1931, Gerd was denied appointment as a teacher at the Udmurt Pedagogical Institute.

In January 1930, at the 1st conference of the All-Udmurt Association of Revolutionary Writers, Gerd's work was classified as part of the "bourgeois-nationalist" sector of Udmurt literature. In 1932, the tone of criticism towards Gerd became harsher. In February, at the 2nd authors' conference of the Udmurt Association of Revolutionary Writers, the poet was declared "an ideologist of the national bourgeoisie," and the latest collection of his poems "Legetyos" ("Steps") was declared a "counter-revolutionary work." The fight against "Gerdovism" became the main task in the development of Udmurt literature. On February 15, 1932, responding to the speeches of the conference delegates, Gerd wrote a statement to the cell of the All-Union Communist Party (Bolsheviks) of the Soviet-party school, in which he admitted "a number of literary and political mistakes".

In February 1932, Gerd was summoned for the first "conversations" with the investigator who had arrived from Gorky, A.D. Antonovsky, the head of the 2nd department of the OGPU in the Gorky Territory. Antonovsky took Gerd to Gorky. On March 22, 1932, Gerd returned to Izhevsk, telling his wife that everything would be fine and the OGPU would guarantee him and his family free travel to Finland.

However, in May he was again summoned to Gorky, where he was arrested on May 13, 1932, on charges of leading a counter-revolutionary organization. The OGPU had fabricated the SOFIN case, named for the fictitious "Union for the Liberation of Finnish Peoples", an organization supposedly dedicated to the secession of the Udmurt Autonomous Oblast and other autonomous oblasts (the Mari Autonomous Oblast, the Mordovian Autonomous Oblast, the Karelian Autonomous Soviet Socialist Republic, and the Komi-Zyryan Autonomous Oblast from the USSR and creation of the United Fenno-Ugric Federation under the protectorate of Finland. The Bolyak society became, according to the OGPU scenario, the basis for SOFIN. The defendants were also accused of maintaining relations with Finnish and Estonian diplomats, espionage for these countries, and preparing terrorist attacks.

The investigation managed to break Gerd and force him to sign a confession of guilt. On July 9, 1933, the Collegium of the OGPU of the USSR sentenced him to death (article not specified). It is believed that at the request of Maxim Gorky, by a resolution of the OGPU Collegium of November 4, 1933, the sentence was replaced by 10 years in labor camp. From December 16, 1933, he served time in Kem – in SorokLag.

According to the records of the NKVD dated October 10, 1937, he was sentenced to capital punishment on unspecified charges and executed by shooting on 1 November. Other sources report that he was shot on 2 November 1937 in the Sandarmokh tract.

He was rehabilitated in the "SOFIN case" in 1958. He was rehabilitated in the case of 1937 in 1961.

Even after the official rehabilitation, there was a biased attitude towards his work in the 1960s and 1970s, conditioned by the ideological dogmas of the party leadership of Udmurtia. An objective assessment of the significance of the life and work of Gerd and recognition of the merits of his work took place only in the 1980s–1990s.
