= Mount Beleyar =

Mountain in Russia

Highest point
- Elevation: 227 m (745 ft)
- Coordinates: 58°3′37″N 52°26′28″E

Geography
- Location: Glazovsky District, Udmurtia, Russia
- Parent range: Krasnogorskaya hill chain

Mount Beleyar (Russian: Белеяр) is a small hill located in Glazovsky District of Udmurtia, Russia. It is 227.1 metres (745 ft) in elevation. Part of the Krasnogorskaya hill chain.

Mount Beleyar is located to the north-west of the village Udmurtskie Klyuchi. Stream Kypkashir flows to the north of the mountain.

== Links ==
- Map O39-069 // Russian army maps
