= Dorvyzhy =

Udmurt literary national epic

Dorvyzhy (Udmurt: Дорвыжы, lit. "homeland roots" or "homeland generation") is the Udmurt literary national epic. It was originally compiled and written in Russian by Mikhail Khudiakov in the 1920s with the title Песнь об удмуртских батырах ("Song about the Udmurt Heroes"). The original was based on the folklore works of N. Pervuhin, G. Potanin, B. Gavrilov, B. Munkácsi, Kuzebay Gerd (K. Chaynikov) and Aleksandr Spitsyn. The structure of the Finnish epic Kalevala was influential in its creation. The epic was later translated into Udmurt in 2004 and given its Udmurt title Дорвыжы by V. M. Vanyushev and then Finnish in 2009 with a Kalevala metre structure by Esa-Jussi Salminen and Jorma Vakkuri. In 2012 the epic was published in Hungarian translation by Dyekiss Virág and Elena V. Rodionova.

Dorvyzhy is a mix of myth and history, recounting the deeds of the heroes such as Selty, Burśin-Mozhga and the sons of Dondy. The main gods in the epic are the god of the heavens Inmar, the earth god Kyldyśin and weather god Kuaź. The epic also makes references to the surrounding peoples of the area such as the Tatars and Maris and geographic places such as the Cheptsa, Kilmez River.

== Cantos ==
Dorvyzhy consists of 10 cantos plus an introduction or beginning words:

- Beginning words (Кyтскон)
- 1st canto: Inmar, Kyldyśin and Kuaź (Инмар, Кылдысин но Куaзь)
- 2nd canto: The Zerpals (Зэрпалъёс)
- 3rd canto: The Year of Kyldyśin (Кылдысин даур)
- 4th canto: Vanished Luck (Ыштэм шуд)
- 5th canto: Vorshud (Воршуд)
- 6th canto: Heroes of Dondy (Дондыпал батыръёс)
- 7th canto: Heroes of Kalmez (Калмез батыръёс)
- 8th canto: Battle with the Maris (Пöръёсын нюръяськон)
- 9th canto: Book of the Ancestors (Выжы книга)
- 10th canto: Times to Come (Вyoнo вaкытъёс)
- conclusion (Йылпумъян)
