= Balezinsky District =

Balezinsky District Балезинский район (Russian)
- District

Other transcription(s)
  - Udmurt: Балезино ёрос
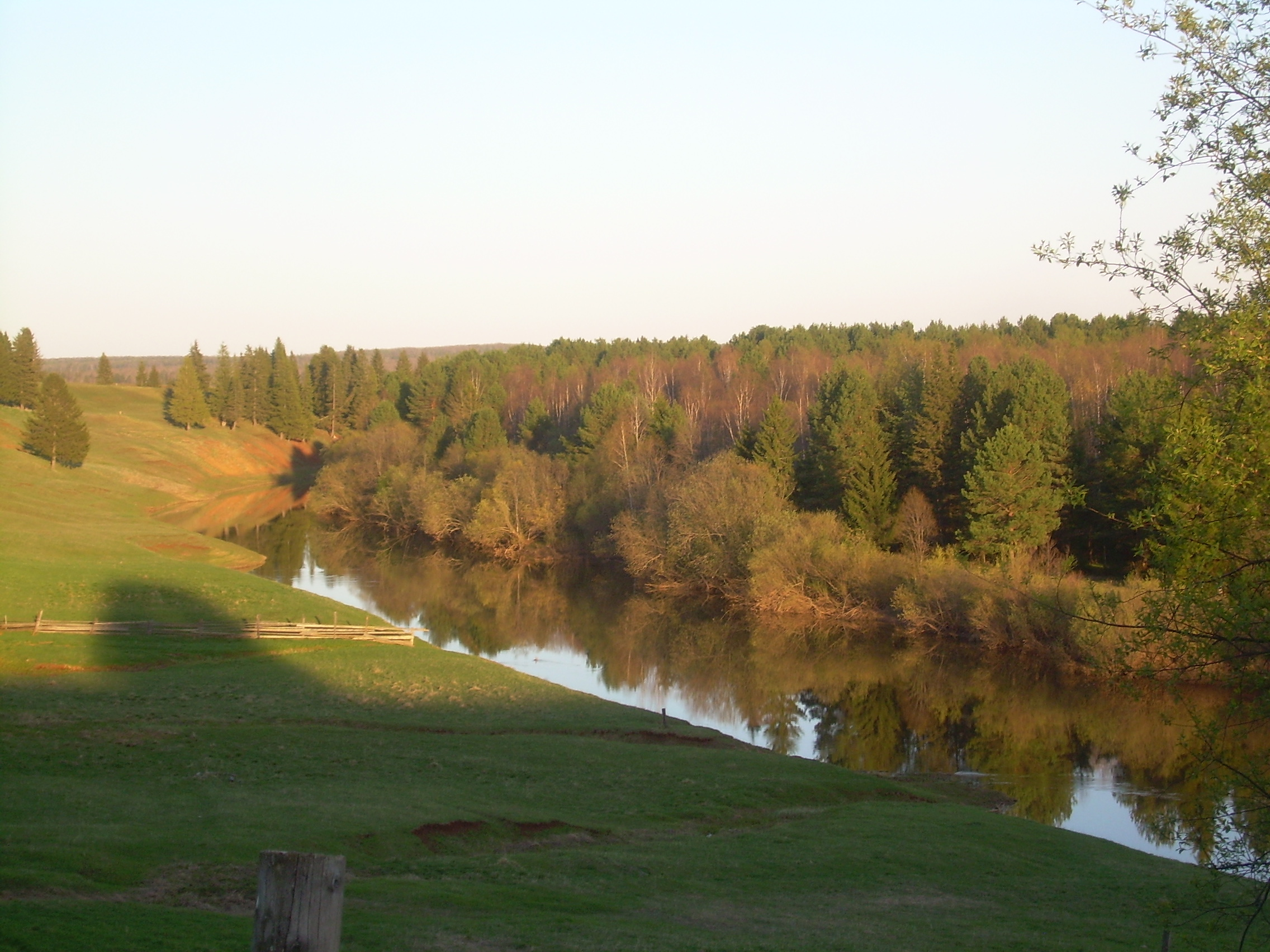
- The upper flows of the Kama River near the selo of Sergino

- Flag Coat of arms
- Location of Balezinsky District in the Udmurt Republic
- Coordinates: 57°58′41″N 53°00′18″E
- Country: Russia
- Federal subject: Udmurt Republic
- Established: July 15, 1929
- Administrative center: Balezino

Area
  - Total: 2,434.7 km^{2} (940.0 sq mi)

Population (2010 Census)
  - Total: 34,617
  - Density: 14.218/km^{2} (36.825/sq mi)
  - Urban: 46.6%
  - Rural: 53.4%

Administrative structure
  - Administrative divisions: 17 selsoviet
  - Inhabited localities: 136 rural localities

Municipal structure
  - Municipally incorporated as: Balezinsky Municipal District
  - Municipal divisions: 0 urban settlements, 17 rural settlements
- Time zone: UTC+4 (MSK+1)
- OKTMO ID: 94604000
- Website: http://balezino.udmurt.ru/

Balezinsky District (Russian: Балези́нский райо́н; Udmurt: Балезино ёрос, Balezino joros) is an administrative and municipal district (raion), one of the twenty-five in the Udmurt Republic, Russia. It is located in the north of the republic. The area of the district is 2,434.7 square kilometers (940.0 sq mi). Its administrative center is the rural locality (a settlement) of Balezino. Population: 34,617 (2010 census); 38,443 (2002 Census); 43,555 (1989 Soviet census). The population of Balezino accounts for 46.6% of the district's total population.

== Geography ==
Rivers flowing through the district include the Cheptsa, the Kep, the Lopya, the Kama, the Pyzep, the Lyuk, and others.

== History ==
The district was created on July 15, 1929 by merging Balezinskaya and Yagoshurskaya Volosts of Glazovsky Uyezd.

== Demographics ==
Ethnic composition (according to the 2002 Census): Udmurt people: 57.6%; Russians: 30.9%; Tatars: 9.8%.
