= Nikolai Kazakovtsev =

Russian ice hockey player

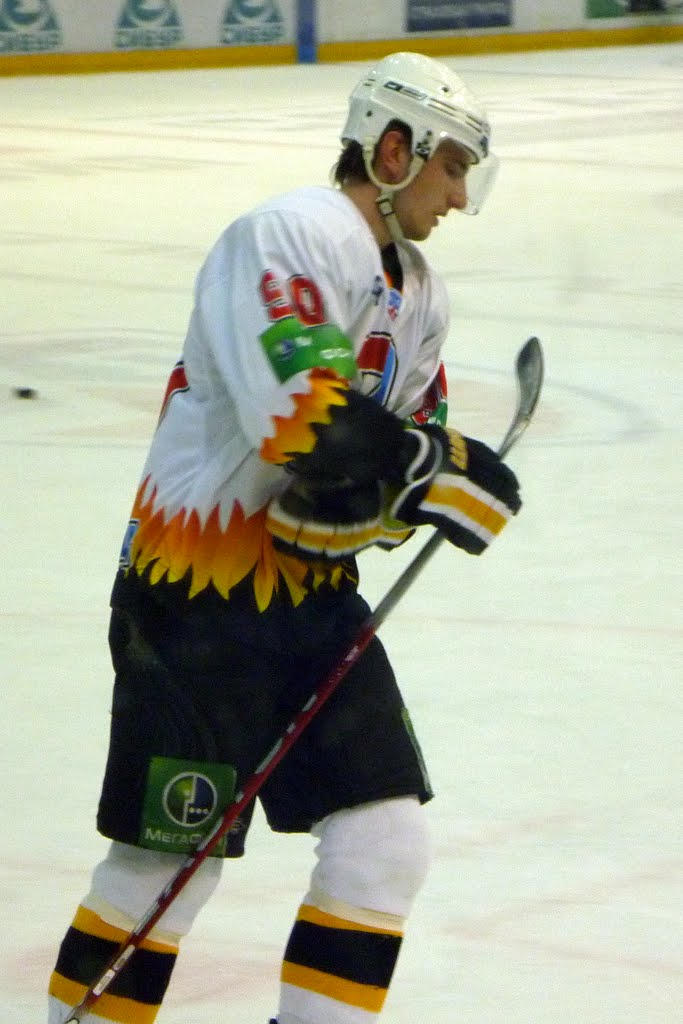
- Born: March 23, 1990 (age 35) Glazov, Russian SFSR
- Height: 6 ft 1 in (185 cm)
- Weight: 190 lb (86 kg; 13 st 8 lb)
- Position: Forward
- Shoots: Left
- KHL team Former teams: Free Agent; Severstal Cherepovets
- Playing career: 2006–present

Nikolai Kazakovtsev (born March 23, 1990) is a Russian professional ice hockey forward who is currently an unrestricted free agent. He previously played the entirety of his career with the Severstal Cherepovets of the Kontinental Hockey League (KHL).
