= Glazovsky District =

Glazovsky District Глазовский район (Russian)
- District

Other transcription(s)
  - Udmurt: Глаз ёрос
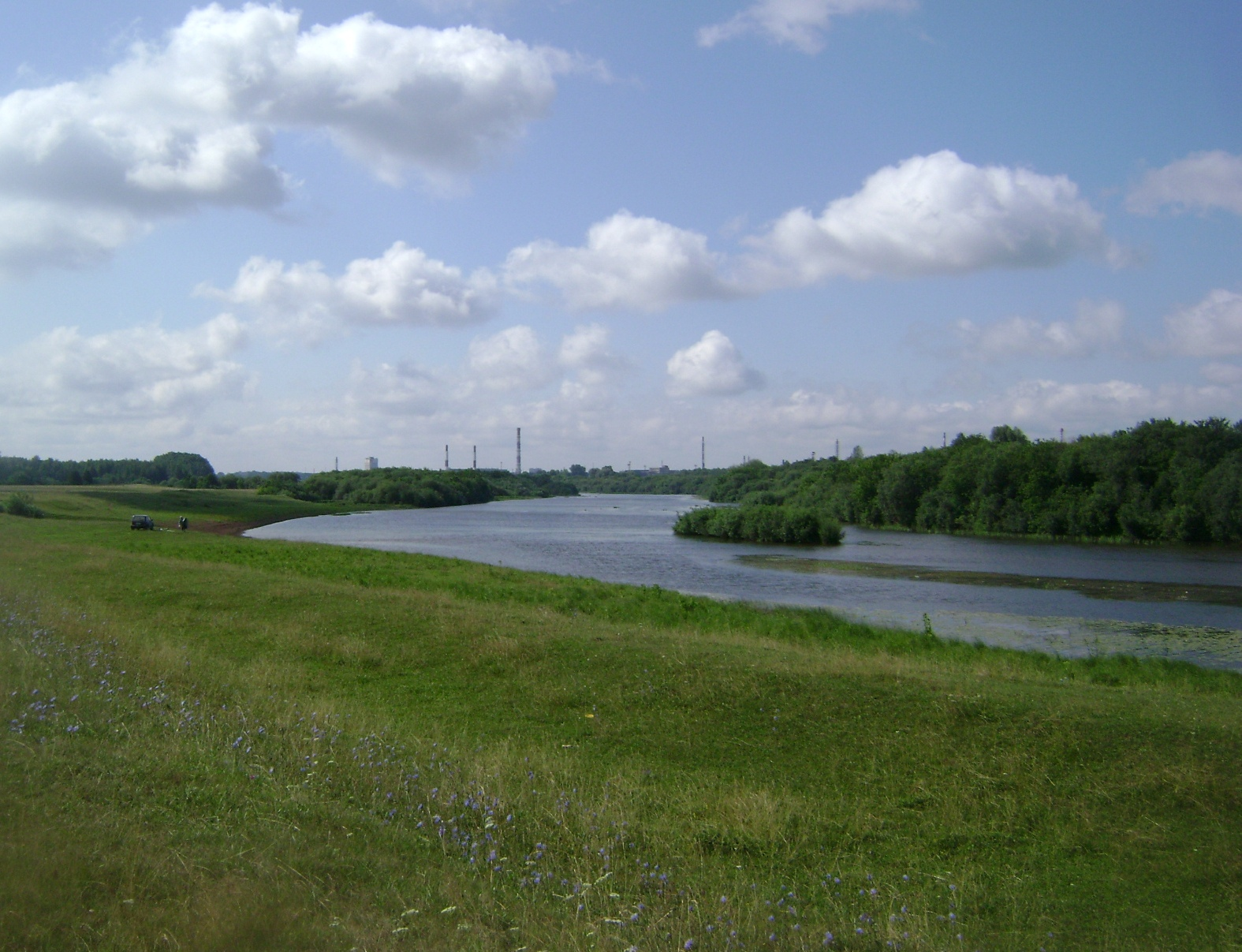
- The Cheptsa River near the village of Verkhnyaya Bogatyrka in Glazovsky District

- Flag Coat of arms
- Location of Glazovsky District in the Udmurt Republic
- Coordinates: 58°08′N 52°40′E
- Country: Russia
- Federal subject: Udmurt Republic
- Established: 15 July 1929
- Administrative center: Glazov

Area
  - Total: 2,159.7 km^{2} (833.9 sq mi)

Population (2010 Census)
  - Total: 17,132
  - Density: 7.9326/km^{2} (20.545/sq mi)
  - Urban: 0%
  - Rural: 100%

Administrative structure
  - Administrative divisions: 16 selsoviet
  - Inhabited localities: 123 rural localities

Municipal structure
  - Municipally incorporated as: Glazovsky Municipal District
  - Municipal divisions: 0 urban settlements, 11 rural settlements
- Time zone: UTC+4 (MSK+1)
- OKTMO ID: 94610000

Glazovsky District (Russian: Гла́зовский райо́н; Udmurt: Глаз ёрос, Glaz joros) is an administrative and municipal district (raion), one of the twenty-five in the Udmurt Republic, Russia. It is located in the north of the republic. The area of the district is 2,159.7 square kilometers (833.9 sq mi). Its administrative center is the city of Glazov (which is not administratively a part of the district). Population: 17,132 (2010 census); 18,792 (2002 Census); 19,161 (1989 Soviet census).

== Geography ==
The Cheptsa River flows through the central parts of the district. Other significant rivers include the Pyzel, the Ubyt, the Sepych, and the Varyzh.

== Administrative and municipal status ==
Within the framework of administrative divisions, Glazovsky District is one of the twenty-five in the republic. The city of Glazov serves as its administrative center, despite being incorporated separately as a city of republic significance—an administrative unit with the status equal to that of the districts.

As a municipal division, the district is incorporated as Glazovsky Municipal District. The city of republic significance of Glazov is incorporated separately from the district as Glazov Urban Okrug.

== Demographics ==
Ethnic composition (according to the 2002 Census): Udmurt people: 79%; Russians: 17.4%; Tatars: 2%; others: 1.6%.
