= Kambarka (disambiguation) =

Kambarka is a town in the Udmurt Republic, Russia.

Kambarka may also refer to:

- Kambarka River, a river in the Udmurt Republic, Russia, on which the town of Kambarka stands
- Kambarka Engineering Works, a rolling stock manufacturer in the Udmurt Republic, Russia
