= National Anthem of Udmurtia =

Udmurt Respublikalen gimnez
English: Anthem of the Udmurt Republic
- Удмурт Республикалэн гимнэз
- Coat of arms of Udmurtia
- Regional anthem of Udmurtia
- Lyrics: Tatiana Vladykina and Alexei Sheptalin
- Music: German Korepanov and Alexander Korepanov
- Adopted: 2002

Audio sample
- Vocal rendition in Udmurt: file; help

Instrumental recording of the anthem

The State Anthem of Udmurt Republic is one of the official state symbols of the Udmurt Republic in Russia, along with the flag and emblem. Its music was composed by German Korepanov and his son Alex, and is based on a melody the father composed back in 1952. The Udmurt lyrics were written by Tatiana Vladykina, and Russian ones were written by Alexei Sheptalin.

The use of the anthem in official settings is governed by Law of the Udmurt Republic of 31 October 2002 N55-РЗ "On the National anthem of the Udmurt Republic". This governs the official situations in which the anthem must, or may, be played, and the order in which the anthem is played with respect to the National Anthem of Russia or those of other countries.

== History ==
After the dissolution of the Soviet Union, a competition within the Udmurt Republic was held, as demands for creating national symbols for federal subjects grew. This included a new creation of a regional anthem, which began in 1992. Out of the 10 works that were submitted, the winner was awarded to composer Alexander Korepanov, who created a melody based on a song his father German had composed in 1952, titled "Native Kama" (Russian: Родная Кама-река).

The melody of the anthem was officially approved on 4 November 1993. For nearly a decade, the anthem did not contain any lyrics. Eventually, in 2002, another competition was announced for the creation of the lyrics. At the competition, 15 people that were historians, ethnographers, poets, composers, writers, journalists, and cultural experts of Udmurtia were to vote for the contestant(s) with the best version of the lyrics. Nearly all of them voted for the versions by Alexei Sheptalin and Tatiana Vladykina, who submitted two independent works in Russian and in Udmurt, respectively.

== Lyrics ==
=== Udmurt version ===
Cyrillic script

Шунды сиос ӝуато палэзез,
Юг ӟардон вуэ музъемам.
Оскон тӧлпо — милемлы Куншетэд,
Дан тыныд, Доре мынам!

Припев:
Югдыты, Быдӟым Инмаре,
Кыдёкысь инвисъёсмес,
Кыдаты выль шудбурмес,
Эрико, йӧн бурдъёсмес!

Тон кадь мусо вань меда дуннеос,
Кужымед пыӵа ёзвиям.
Ӟеч ивордэ гурлало туриос,
Дан тыныд, Доре мынам!

Припев

Дун ошмес ву жильыртэ шуръёсын,
Волга-Кам — пачыл вирсэрам.
Россиен ӵош кайгуын но данын
Тон, Удмуртие мынам!

Припев

Latin script

Šundy sios džuato paleźez,
Jug dźardon vue muzjemam.
Oskon tõlpo – miľemly Kunšeted,
Dan tynyd, Dore mynam!

Pripev:
Jugdyty, Byddźym Inmare,
Kyďokyś invisjosmes,
Kydaty vyľ šudburmes,
Eriko, jõn burdjosmes!

Ton kaď muso vań meda dunńeos,
Kužymed pyča jozvijam.
Dźeć ivorde gurlalo turios,
Dan tynyd, Dore mynam!

Pripev

Dun ošmes vu žiľyrte šurjosyn,
Volga-Kam – paćyl virseram.
Rossijen čoš kajguyn no danyn
Ton, Udmurtije mynam!

Pripev

IPA transcription

[ʂun.dɨ sʲi.os | d͡ʐu.a.to pa.ɫe.zʲez |]
[jug d͡zʲar.don | vu.e muz.je.mam ‖]
[os.kon təɫ.po | mʲi.lʲem.ɫɨ kun.ʂe.ted |]
[dan tɨ.nɨd | do.rʲe mɨ.nam ǁ]

[prʲi.pʲef]
[jug.dɨ.tɨ | bɨd.d͡zʲɨm in.ma.rʲe |]
[kɨ.dʲo.kɨsʲ iɱ.vʲis.jos.mʲes ‖]
[kɨ.da.tɨ | vɨlʲ ʂud.bur.mʲes |]
[e.rʲi.ko | jən burd.jos.mʲes ǁ]

[toŋ‿kadʲ mu.so | vanʲ mʲe.da dunʲ.nʲe.os |]
[ku.ʐɨ.mʲed | pɨ.t͡ʂa joz.vʲi.jam ‖]
[d͡zʲet͡ɕ i.vor.de | gur.ɫa.ɫo tu.rʲi.os |]
[dan tɨ.nɨd | do.rʲe mɨ.nam ǁ]

[prʲi.pʲef]

[dun oʂ.mʲez‿vu | ʐi.lʲɨr.tʲe ʂur.jo.sɨn |]
[voɫ.ga.kam | pa.t͡ɕɨɫ vʲir.se.ram ‖]
[rosʲ.sʲi.jen t͡ʂoʂ | kaj.gu.ɨn no da.nɨn |]
[ton ud.mur.tʲi.je mɨ.nam ǁ]

[prʲi.pʲef]

=== Russian version ===
Cyrillic script

Солнце горит в алых гроздьях рябин,
Новый день встречает земля,
Реет твой флаг над простором равнин,
О Удмуртия моя!

Припев:
Воссияй, Отчизна моя,
Счастьем путь нам озаряй!
Да хранит Господь тебя,
Расцветай, любимый край!

Краше тебя нет на свете земли,
Широки леса и поля,
Весть о тебе вдаль несут журавли,
Славься, Родина моя!

Припев

Каму и Волгу питала века
Родников живая вода,
В горе и славе с Россией всегда
Ты, Удмуртия моя!

Припев

IPA transcrption

[ˈson.t͡sɨ ɡɐ.ˈrʲit ǀ v‿a.ɫɨx ˈɡro.zdʲjɐx ˈrʲa.bʲɪn ǀ]
[ˈno.vɨj dʲɛn ǀ fstrʲɪ.ˈt͡ɕa.jɪd‿zʲɪm.ˈlʲa ǁ]
[ˈrʲɛ.jɪt tvoj flak ǀ nat‿prɐs.ˈto.rəm ˈra.vnʲɪn ǀ]
[ɐ ʊ.ˈdmur.tʲɪ.jə mɐ.ˈja ǁ]

[prʲɪ.ˈpʲɛf]
[vəsʲ.sʲɪ.ˈjaj ǀ ɐt.ˈt͡ɕʲi.znə mɐ.ˈja ǀ]
[ˈɕːa.sʲtʲjɪm putʲ ǀ nam ɐ.ˈza.rʲəj ǁ]
[da xrɐ.ˈnʲit ǀ ɡɐ.ˈspotʲ tʲɪ.ˈbʲa ǀ]
[rɐs.t͡svʲɪ.ˈtaj ǀ lʲu.ˈbʲi.mɨj kraj ǁ]

[ˈkra.ʂɨ tʲɪ.ˈbʲa ǀ nʲɛt na ˈsvʲɛ.tʲɪ zʲɪmʲ.ˈlʲi ǀ]
[ʂɨ.rɐ.ˈkʲi ǀ lʲɪ.ˈsa i pɐ.ˈlʲa ǁ]
[vʲɛstʲ ɐ tʲɪ.ˈbʲɛ ǀ vdalʲ nʲɪ.ˈsut ʐʊ.rɐ.ˈvʲlʲi ǀ]
[ˈsɫa.fʲsʲə ǀ ˈro.dʲɪ.nə mɐ.ˈja ǁ]

[prʲɪ.ˈpʲɛf]

[ˈka.mʊ‿i ˈvoɫ.ɡʊ ǀ pʲɪ.ˈta.ɫə ˈvʲɛ.kə ǀ]
[rɐ.dnʲɪ.ˈkof ǀ ʐɨ.ˈva.jə vɐ.ˈda ǁ]
[v‿ˈɡo.rʲɪ‿i ˈsɫa.vʲɪ ǀ s‿rɐsʲ.ˈsʲi.jɪj fsʲɪɡ.ˈda ǀ]
[tɨ ʊ.ˈdmur.tʲɪ.jə mɐ.ˈja ǁ]

[prʲɪ.ˈpʲɛf]

=== English translation ===
The sunrays shine the mountain ashes,
The daylights brighten up my land.
Your banner soars over the expanse,
Praise to you, O motherland!

Chorus:
Shine and glow! O holy heavens!
From afar on our horizons!
May there be new happiness –
Let's aspire with our proud wings!

Are there worlds as lovely as you?
Your strength flows through my mortal soul.
Cranes bring you nothing but good news,
Praise to you, O motherland!

Chorus

Pure spring waters glimmer in the rivers,
Volga and Kam flow in my veins.
Within Russia in grief and in glory,
You are my Udmurtia!

Chorus

== See also ==
- Music of Udmurtia
