= Flag of the Udmurt Autonomous Soviet Socialist Republic =

Udmurt Autonomous Soviet Socialist Republic
- Flag of the Udmurt ASSR (1978–1991)
- Use: Civil and state flag
- Proportion: 1:2
- Adopted: 29 March 1954; 31 May 1978 (minor changes)
- Design: A red flag with a light-blue stripe at the pole, with golden red star and hammer and sickle.
- Designed by: Valentin Petrovich Viktorov

The flag of the Udmurt Autonomous Soviet Socialist Republic was adopted in 1954 by the government of the Udmurt Autonomous Soviet Socialist Republic. The flag is identical to the flag of the Russian Soviet Federative Socialist Republic.

== History ==
=== First version ===
The first flag of the Udmurt ASSR was described in the first Constitution of the Udmurt ASSR, which was adopted by the Central Executive Committee of the Udmurt ASSR on 14 March 1937, at the 2nd Extraordinary Congress of Soviets of the Udmurt ASSR. The flag is described in Article 116 of the constitution :

The state flag of the Udmurt Autonomous Soviet Socialist Republic is the state flag of the RSFSR, consisting of a red cloth, in the left corner of which at the top of the shaft are placed the golden letters "RSFSR". in Russian and Udmurt, with an additional inscription under the letters "RSFSR" smaller letters "Udmurt A.S.S.R." in Russian and Udmurt

— Constitution of the Udmurt ASSR (1937), Article 110

=== Second version ===
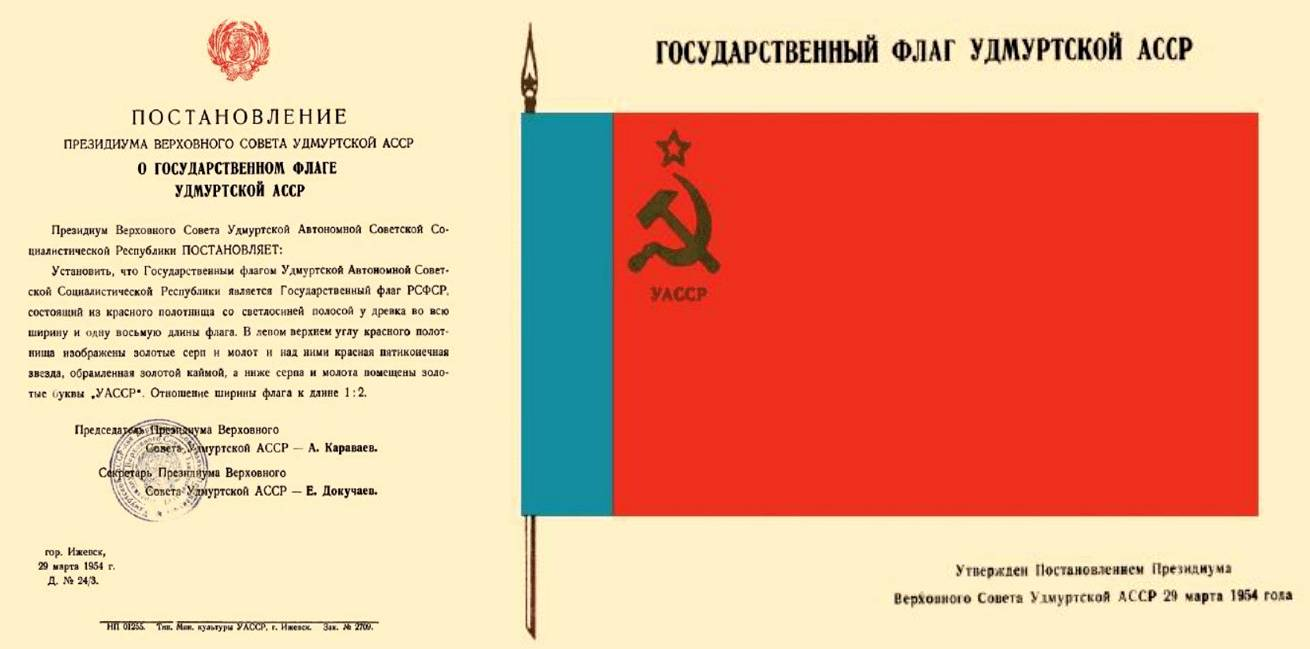
Decree on the Flag of the Udmurt ASSR, approved on 29 March 1954.

On March 29, 1954, by the decision of the Presidium of the Supreme Council of the Udmurt ASSR, a new state flag of the Udmurt ASSR was adopted, which was approved by the Law of the Udmurt ASSR of July 8, 1954. On April 6, 1955, Article 110 of the Constitution of the Udmurt ASSR was amended:

The state flag of the Udmurt Autonomous Soviet Socialist Republic is the state flag of the RSFSR, consisting of a red cloth with a light blue stripe at the flagpole, the full width of the flag. The light blue stripe is one-eighth of the flag’s length. Above them is a red five-pointed star, framed by a gold border, and below the sickle and hammer are placed the golden letters “УАССР”. The ratio of the flag's width to its length is 1:2.

— Constitution of the Udmurt ASSR (1937, amended 1954), Article 110

The decree on the state flag of the Udmurt ASSR was approved by the Decree of the Presidium of the Supreme Soviet of the Udmurt ASSR on March 10, 1956.

==== Revision ====
On May 31, 1978, the extraordinary 9th session of the Supreme Soviet of the Udmurt ASSR adopted the new constitution of the Udmurt ASSR. The article 158 of the constitution contains the design of the flag:

The national flag of the Udmurt Autonomous Soviet Socialist Republic is the National Flag of the RSFSR, which is a red rectangular panel with a light blue stripe at the flagpole, which is one-eighth of the flag’s length. the hammer and a red five-pointed star above them, framed by a gold border, and under them in gold letters is placed the inscription "Udmurt ASSR" in Russian and Udmurt languages .The ratio of the width of the flag to its length - 1:2

— Constitution of the Udmurt ASSR (1978), Article 158

== Gallery ==
14 March 1937 – 29 March 1954

29 March 1954 – 31 May 1978

31 May 1978 – 24 May 1991

24 May 1991 (as the Udmurt SSR) - 4 November 1993 (adoption of the Flag of Udmurtia)

== See also ==
- Emblem of the Udmurt Autonomous Soviet Socialist Republic
- Flag of Udmurtia
- Flag of the Russian Soviet Federative Socialist Republic
