= Flag of Udmurtia =

Udmurt Republic
- Proportion: 1:2
- Adopted: 4 November 1993
- Design: A vertical tricolor of black, white and red (from left to right) with an eight-pointed red cross.
- Designed by: Yuri Lobanov
- Flag of the Udmurt SSR, then Udmurtia (1991–1993)
- Proportion: 1:2
- Adopted: 24 May 1991
- Design: Variant of the flag of the Russian SFSR with "Udmurt SSR" written in the Russian and Udmurt languages below the hammer and sickle.

The flag of Udmurtia is one of the official state symbols of the Udmurt Republic, along with its emblem and anthem. The proportion of width and length of the flag is 1:2. It is a rectangular three-color cloth consisting of vertical equal stripes of black, white and red (from left to right) with an eight-pointed red cross (an Octagram). The black colour in the flag is a symbol of the earth and stability, red means the sun and life and white means a space and moral purity. The designer of the flag of the Udmurt Republic was Yuri Lobanov. The appropriate law N26-РЗ "On the National Flag of the Udmurt Republic" appeared on 30 April 2002.

== The emblem ==
The cross/star symbol represents the solar sign, a protective symbol that according to folklore protects man from misfortunes. The cross does not overlap the black and red stripes, and its size is such that it fits within a square whose side is equal to 5/6 of the width of one of the vertical stripes of the flag. The width of the vertical and horizontal cross-bars of the solar sign is equal to one third of the side of this imaginary square. Each arm ends with two symmetrical teeth, the internal sides of which form a 90-degree angle where they meet, a vertex deepened towards the center of the sign at 1/2 arm width.

== History ==
=== As the Udmurt ASSR ===
The first flag of the Udmurt ASSR was described in the first Constitution of the Udmurt ASSR, which was adopted by the Central Executive Committee of the Udmurt ASSR on 14 March 1937, at the second Extraordinary Congress of Soviets of the Udmurt ASSR. The flag was similar to the flag of the Russian SFSR at that time. The flag was a red flag, with the yellow inscription "RSFSR" in the left corner of the flag, and the inscription "Udmurt A.S.S.R." in Russian and Udmurt.

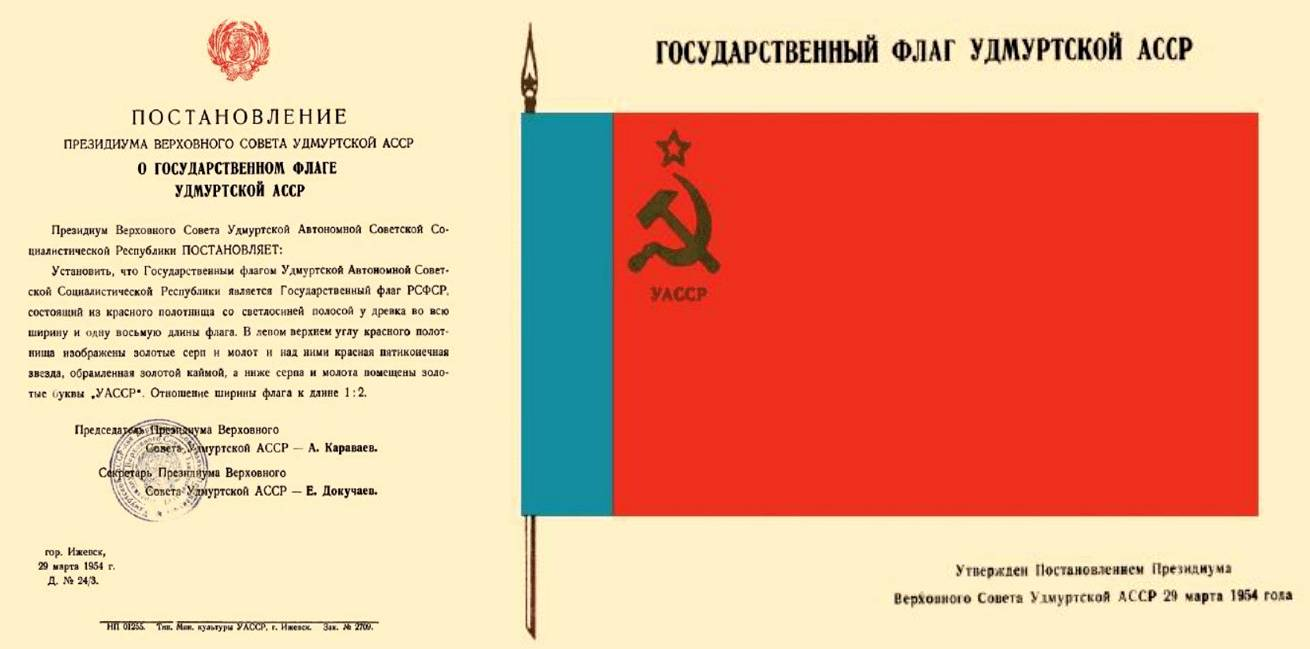
Decree on the Flag of the Udmurt ASSR, approved on 29 March 1954.

On 29 March 1954, by the decision of the Presidium of the Supreme Council of the Udmurt ASSR, a new state flag of the Udmurt ASSR was adopted, which was approved by the Law of the Udmurt ASSR of 8 July 1954. The flag is still similar with the flag of the RSFSR. The flag had a length-to-width ratio of one to two (1:2). The flag was a red flag, with a light-blue stripe at the pole extending all the height which constitutes 1/8 length of the flag. In the upper corner of the flag, there was a hammer and sickle. Below the hammer and sickle were the letters “УАССР” in yellow.

The inscriptions changed after the adoption of a new constitution on 31 May 1978. The inscription “УАССР” was changed with the inscription "Udmurt ASSR" in Russian and Udmurt languages.

14 March 1937 – 29 March 1954

29 March 1954 – 31 May 1978

31 May 1978 – 24 May 1991

24 May 1991 (as the Udmurt SSR) – 4 November 1993

=== Pre-national revival flag ===
Prior to the national revival in Udmurtia, the national movements in the Udmurt ASSR used a white flag with red and black stripes on the bottom edge, with a black ideogram on a white field. The flag was designed by Kasim Galikhanov.

=== National revival ===
During the glasnost period in the Soviet Union, many of the ASSRs in the Soviet Union began a process of national revival. In Udmurtia itself, the first official flag of Udmurtia was adopted in the 1st All-Union Congress of the Udmurts, organized by the Society of the Udmurt Culture. The flag consisted of three horizontal stripes—red, black and white. The flag was based on a poem by Udmurt national poet V. Vladykin Why a Tyuragay Sings (Russian: Отчего поёт тюрагай).

There are three great colors:
Red, black, and white.
The sun is red
The earth is black
The white light covers all.

Flag presented at the 1st All-Union Congress of Udmurts in 1989.

Another Udmurt national movement flag. Designed by Kasim Galikhanov.

A flag similar in design to Galikhanov's distributed by Udmurt activists in 1989.

A more complex flag designed by Kasim Galikhanov.

== Proposed flags ==
Designs by V. Kovalchukov and E. Shumilov which sought to combine the Udmurt national colours with the Russian tricolour.

=== Other designs ===
Extra designs for the Udmurt flag by Yuri Lobanov. The current flag was among many similar designs submitted by Lobanov.

== See also ==
- Flag of the Udmurt Autonomous Soviet Socialist Republic
- Auseklis
- Flag of Mordovia
