= Balezino =

Rural locality in Balezinsky District, Udmurt Republic, Russia

Coordinates: 57°59′00″N 53°00′30″E

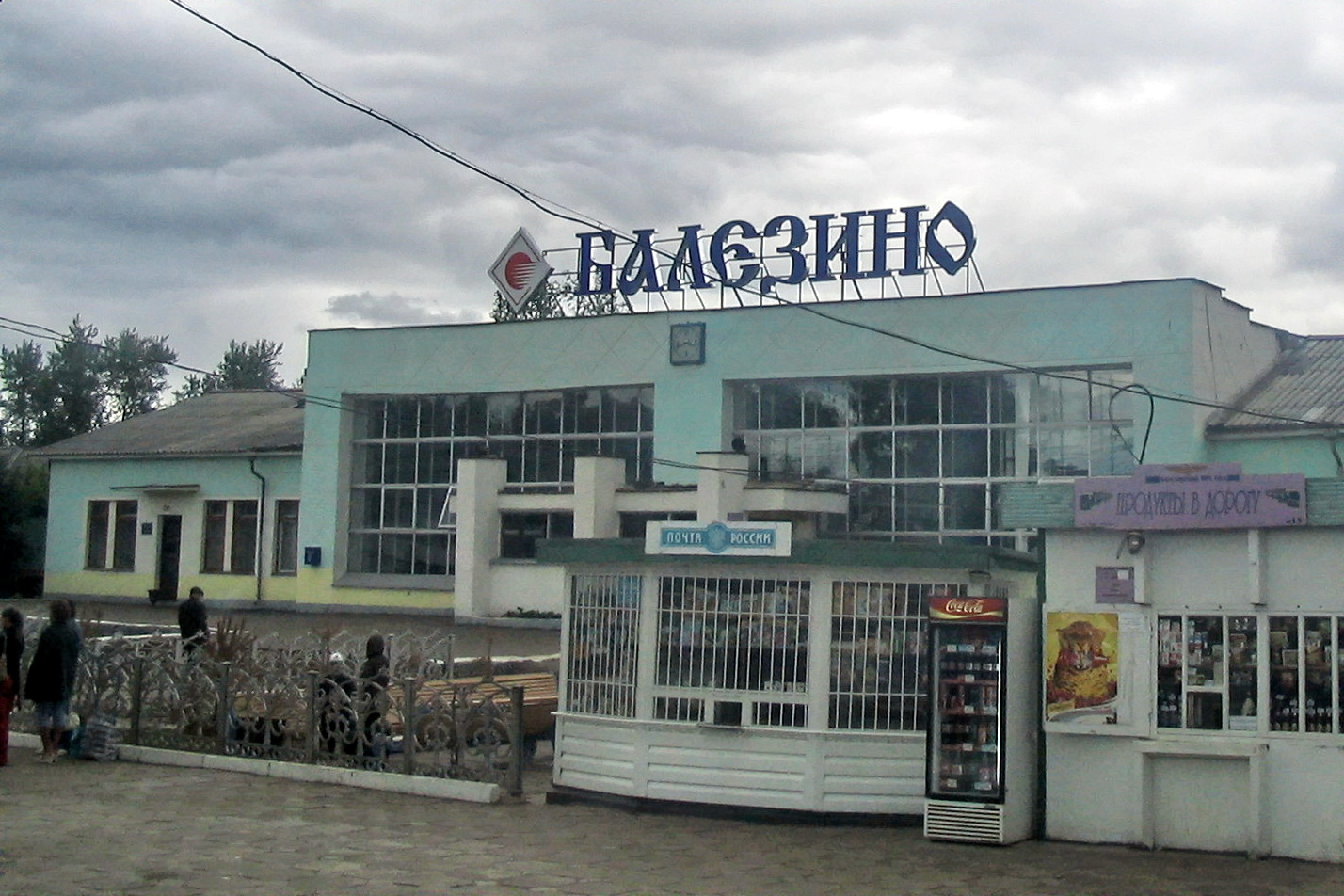
Balezino railway station on the Trans-Siberian Railway

Balezino (Russian: Бале́зино) is a rural locality (a settlement) and the administrative center of Balezinsky District of the Udmurt Republic, Russia. Population: 16,121 (2010 census); 16,804 (2002 census); 18,492 (1989 Soviet census).

== History ==
Balezino had work settlement status until it was demoted to a rural locality in March 2012.

== Transportation ==
It is an important station of the Trans-Siberian Railway, situated roughly in the center between Kirov and Perm, and is a junction point of 25 kV AC rail line going to Kirov and 3 kV DC line going to Perm. Long distance trains stop for at least thirty minutes at the Balezino station for maintenance, which includes the engine replacement from AC one to DC one.
