= Vavozh (rural locality), Vavozhsky Selsoviet, Vavozhsky District, Udmurt Republic =

Rural locality in Udmurtia, Russia

Coordinates: 56°46′06″N 51°55′51″E

Vavozh (Russian: Вавож, Udmurt: Вавож, Vavož) is a rural locality (a selo) and the administrative center of Vavozhsky District, Udmurtia, Russia. Population: 5,816 (2010 census); 5,631 (2002 census); 5,085 (1989 Soviet census).
