= Udmurt Regional Committee of the Communist Party of the Soviet Union =

The First Secretary of the Udmurt regional branch of the Communist Party of the Soviet Union was the position of highest authority in the Votyak AO (1920–1932), Udmurt AO (1932–1934) and the Udmurt ASSR (1934–1991) in the Russian SFSR of the Soviet Union. The position was created in February, 1920, and abolished in August 1991. The First Secretary was a de facto appointed position usually by the Politburo or the General Secretary himself.

== List of First Secretaries of the Udmurt Communist Party ==
Name	Term of Office		Life years
Name	Start	End	Life years
First Secretaries of the Oblast Committee of the Communist Party
Stepan Baryshnikov	February 1921	July 1921	1894–1943
Vasily Fomin	July 1921	August 1923	1896–1938
Aleksey Sulimov	August 1923	December 1923	1893–?
Derenik Apresyan (Note: Acting)	December 1923	February 1924	1899–1939
Grigory Aronshtam	February 1924	May 1926	1893–1938
Stepan Baryshnikov	October 1926	August 1927	1894–1943
Vasily Yegorov	August 1927	October 1930	1899–1950
Mark Temkin	October 1930	February 26, 1933	1895–1980
Suren Akopyan	February 26, 1933	December 20, 1934	1898–1938
Boris Berman	December 20, 1934	July 1937	1897–1938
Stepan Baryshnikov	July 1937	June 7, 1938	1894–1943
Dmitry Shlenov	June 1938	January 1939	1891–1957
First Secretaries of the Communist Party
Dmitry Shlenov	December 28, 1934	January 1939	1891–1957
Vasily Kiselyev	January 11, 1939	March 12, 1940	1907–1986
Anatoly Chekinov	March 15, 1940	November 11, 1948	1909–1986
Pyotr Lysov	November 13, 1948	September 25, 1950	1907–?
Mikhail Suetin	September 25, 1950	January 23, 1957	1906–1986
Georgy Vorobyev	January 23, 1957	April 10, 1959	1914–2002
Aleksandr Kidin	April 10, 1959	June 6, 1959	1909–1959
Igor Skulkov	July 23, 1959	December 20, 1963	1913–1971
Valery Marisov	December 21, 1963	December 13, 1985	1915–1992
Pyotr Grishchenko	December 13, 1985	June 8, 1990	1931–
Nikolay Sapozhnikov	June 9, 1990	August 1991	1949–

== See also ==
- Udmurt Autonomous Oblast
- Udmurt Autonomous Soviet Socialist Republic

== Sources ==
- World Statesmen.org
