= Vavozhsky District =

Vavozhsky District Вавожский район (Russian)
- District

Other transcription(s)
  - Udmurt: Вавож ёрос
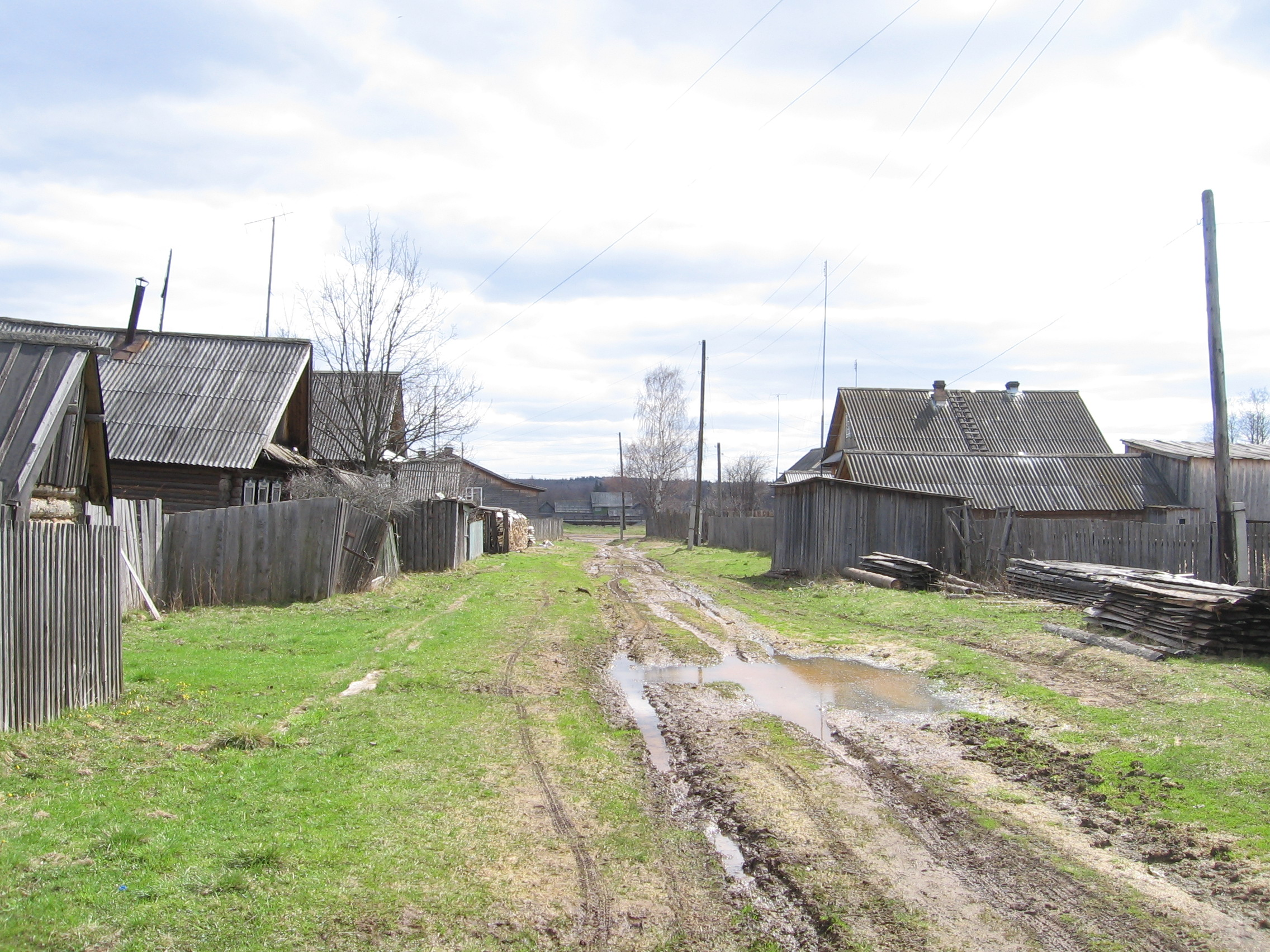
- The selo of Kakmozh in Vavozhsky District

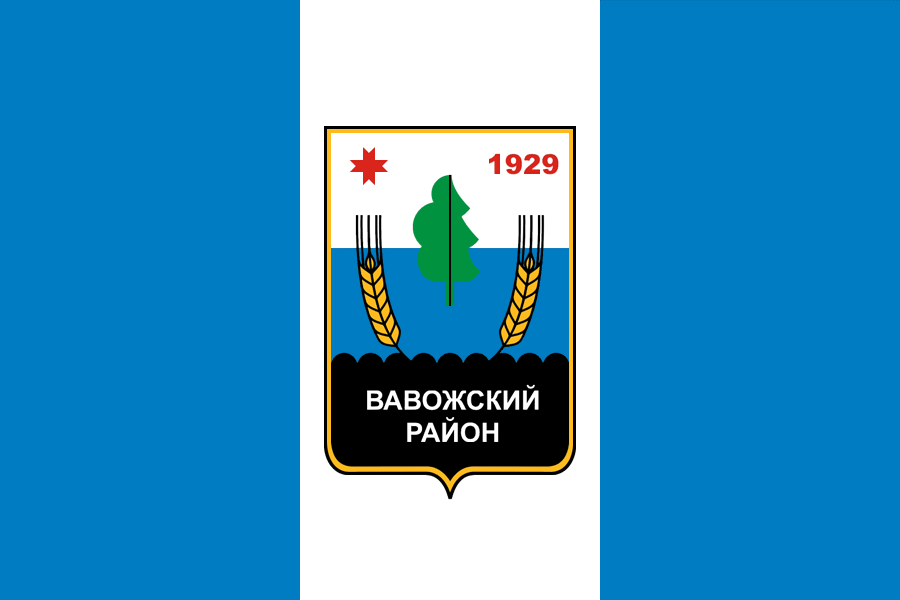
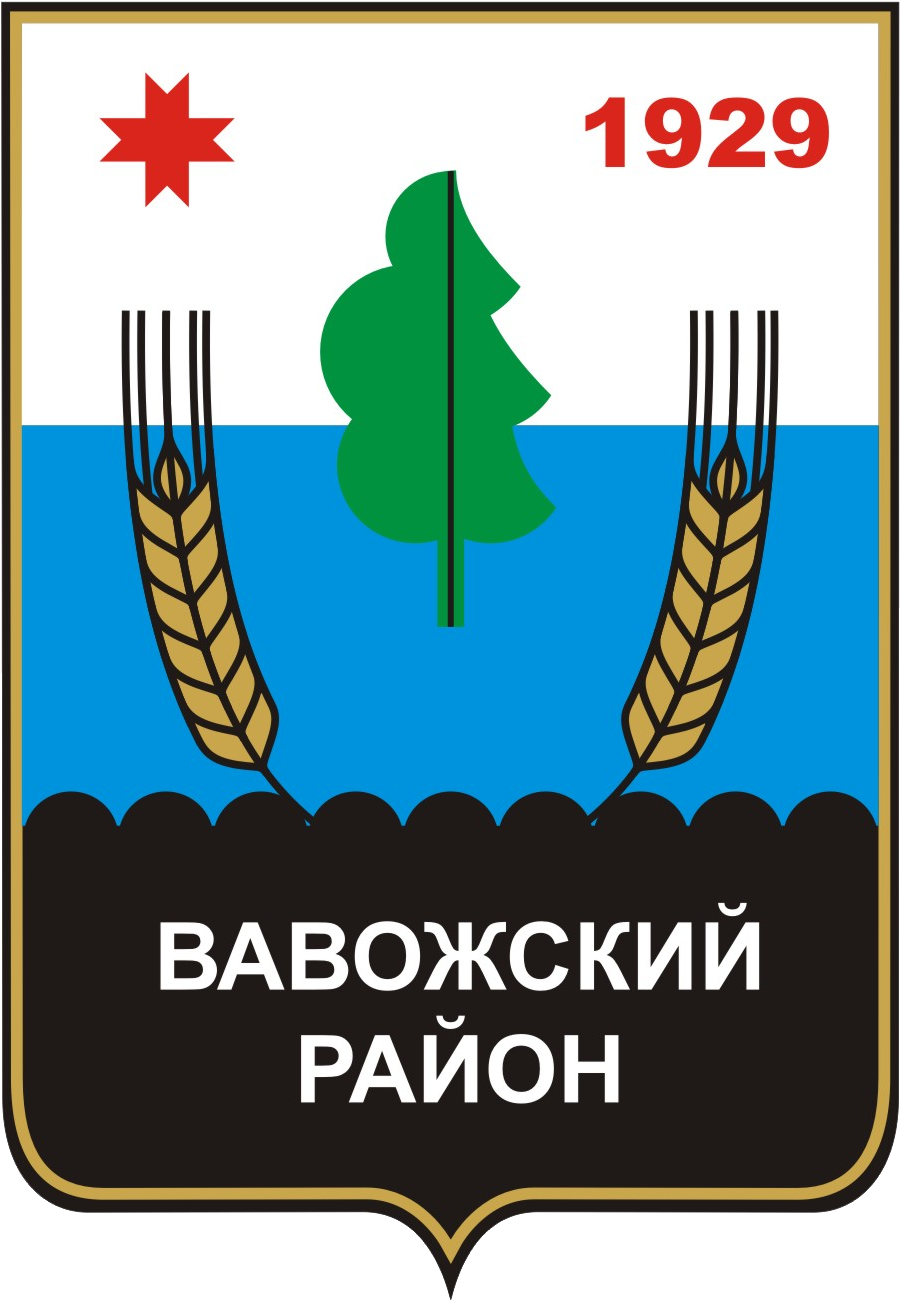
- Flag Coat of arms
- Location of Vavozhsky District in the Udmurt Republic
- Coordinates: 56°48′N 51°54′E
- Country: Russia
- Federal subject: Udmurt Republic
- Established: 15 July 1929
- Administrative center: Vavozh

Area
  - Total: 1,679 km^{2} (648 sq mi)

Population (2010 Census)
  - Total: 16,351
  - Density: 9.739/km^{2} (25.22/sq mi)
  - Urban: 0%
  - Rural: 100%

Administrative structure
  - Administrative divisions: 10 selsoviet
  - Inhabited localities: 69 rural localities

Municipal structure
  - Municipally incorporated as: Vavozhsky Municipal District
  - Municipal divisions: 0 urban settlements, 10 rural settlements
- Time zone: UTC+4 (MSK+1)
- OKTMO ID: 94506000
- Website: http://vavozh-raion.udmurt.ru/

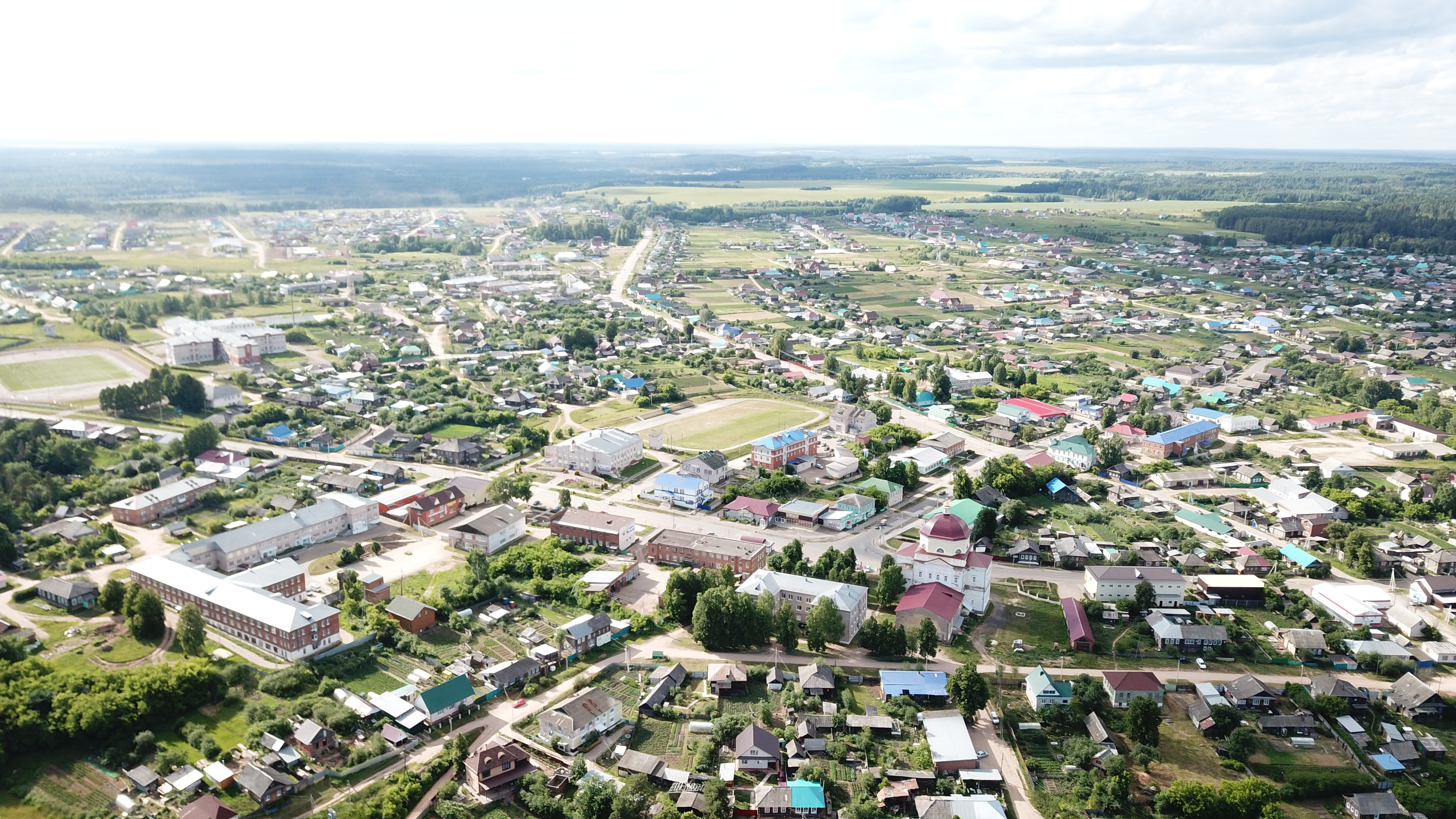
View of Vavozh

Vavozhsky District (Russian: Ваво́жский райо́н; Udmurt: Вавож ёрос, Vavož joros) is an administrative and municipal district (raion), one of the twenty-five in the Udmurt Republic, Russia. It is located in the southwest of the republic. The area of the district is 1,679 square kilometers (648 sq mi). Its administrative center is the rural locality (a selo) of Vavozh. Population: 16,351 (2010 census); 17,323 (2002 Census); 18,130 (1989 Soviet census). The population of the administrative center accounts for 35.6% of the district's total population.
