= Coat of arms of Udmurtia =

Coat of arms of the Udmurt Republic
- Armiger: Aleksandr Brechalov, Head of the Udmurt Republic
- Adopted: 1994

The Coat of arms of Udmurtia is one of the official state symbols of Udmurtia.

The coat of arms consists of a round red-and-black shield, on which there is a white swan with spread wings. In the emblem, black represents stability and earth; red life and the sun; and white moral purity and space.

The white swan is a symbol of revival, wisdom and perfection. It is based on the mythology of the Udmurt people and other nations of Udmurtia. The solar signs are meant to protect man from misfortune.

The designer of the national emblem of the Udmurt Republic is Y.Lobanov.

== History ==
Emblem of the Udmurt Autonomous Soviet Socialist Republic
- Armiger: Udmurt Autonomous Soviet Socialist Republic
- Adopted: 14 March 1937
- Crest: Red star
- Supporters: Wheat and Cotton
- Motto: Пролетарии всех стран, соединяйтесь! (Russian) Вань странаосысь пролетарийёс, огазеяське! (Udmurt) "Workers of the world, unite!"

On March 14, 1937, the Extraordinary 2nd Congress of Soviets of the Udmurt Autonomous Soviet Socialist Republic adopted the Constitution of the Udmurt Autonomous Soviet Socialist Republic. The Article 109 of the Constitution contained the description of the state emblem:

The national emblem of the Udmurt Autonomous Soviet Socialist Republic is the state emblem of the RSFSR, which consists of an image of a gold sickle and a hammer, placed crosswise, with handles down, on a red background in the sun and framed with ears of wheat "RSFSR" and "Proletarians of all countries, unite!" in Russian and Udmurt languages, with the addition of smaller letters "РСФСР" under the inscription "Удмуртская АССР" in Russian and Udmurt languages"

— Constitution of the Udmurt ASSR (1937), Article 109

The design of the actual emblem doesn't match with the constitution. Instead of a full inscription of the name of the ASSR, the abbreviation of the ASSR was abbreviated. The motto in the Udmurt language was depicted on the ribbon on the right, and in Russian on the left.

=== First revision ===
On May 31, 1978, the extraordinary IX session of the Supreme Soviet of the UASSR of the ninth adopted the new Constitution of the Udmurt Autonomous Soviet Socialist Republic. The article 157 of the constitution contained the description of the state emblem:

The State Emblem of the Udmurt Autonomous Soviet Socialist Republic is the State Emblem of the RSFSR, which is an image of a hammer and sickle on a red background, in the sun and framed with ears of wheat, with the inscription" RSFSR "in Russian and" Proletarians of all countries, unite! " and the Udmurt languages with the addition of "Udmurt ASSR" in Russian and Udmurt in the lower part of the inscription "RSFSR", with a five-pointed star at the top of the emblem."

— Constitution of the Udmurt ASSR (1978), Article 157

In accordance with this description of the Udmurt Autonomous Soviet Socialist Republic, the "Statute on the State Emblem of the Udmurt Autonomous Soviet Socialist Republic" was approved. The name of the ASSR in Russian and Udmurt was depicted on the coat of arms in full words, rather than abbreviation. The motto in the Udmurt language was located on the red ribbon under the motto in Russian. The coat of arms, like the coat of arms of the RSFSR and other ASSRs, was crowned with a red five-pointed star in a thin white border with a brown outline.

The motto in the Udmurt language : ВАНЬ СТРАНАОСЫСЬ ПРОЛЕТАРИЙЁС, ОГАЗЕЯСЬКЕ!

== Gallery ==
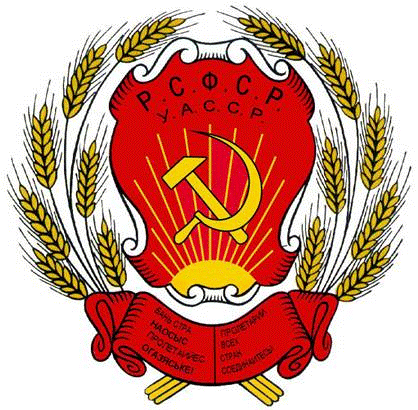
Emblem of the Udmurt ASSR (1937–1967)

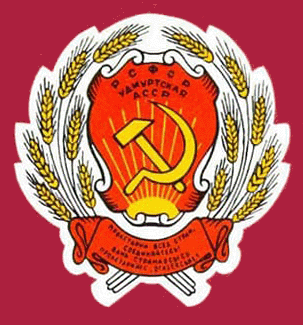
Emblem of the Udmurt ASSR (1967–1978)

Emblem of the Udmurt ASSR (1978–1991), the Udmurt SSR (1991–1992) and the Udmurt Republic (1992–1994)

== See also ==
- Flag of Udmurtia
