= Kambarsky District =

Kambarsky District Камбарский район (Russian)
- District

Other transcription(s)
  - Udmurt: Камбарка ёрос
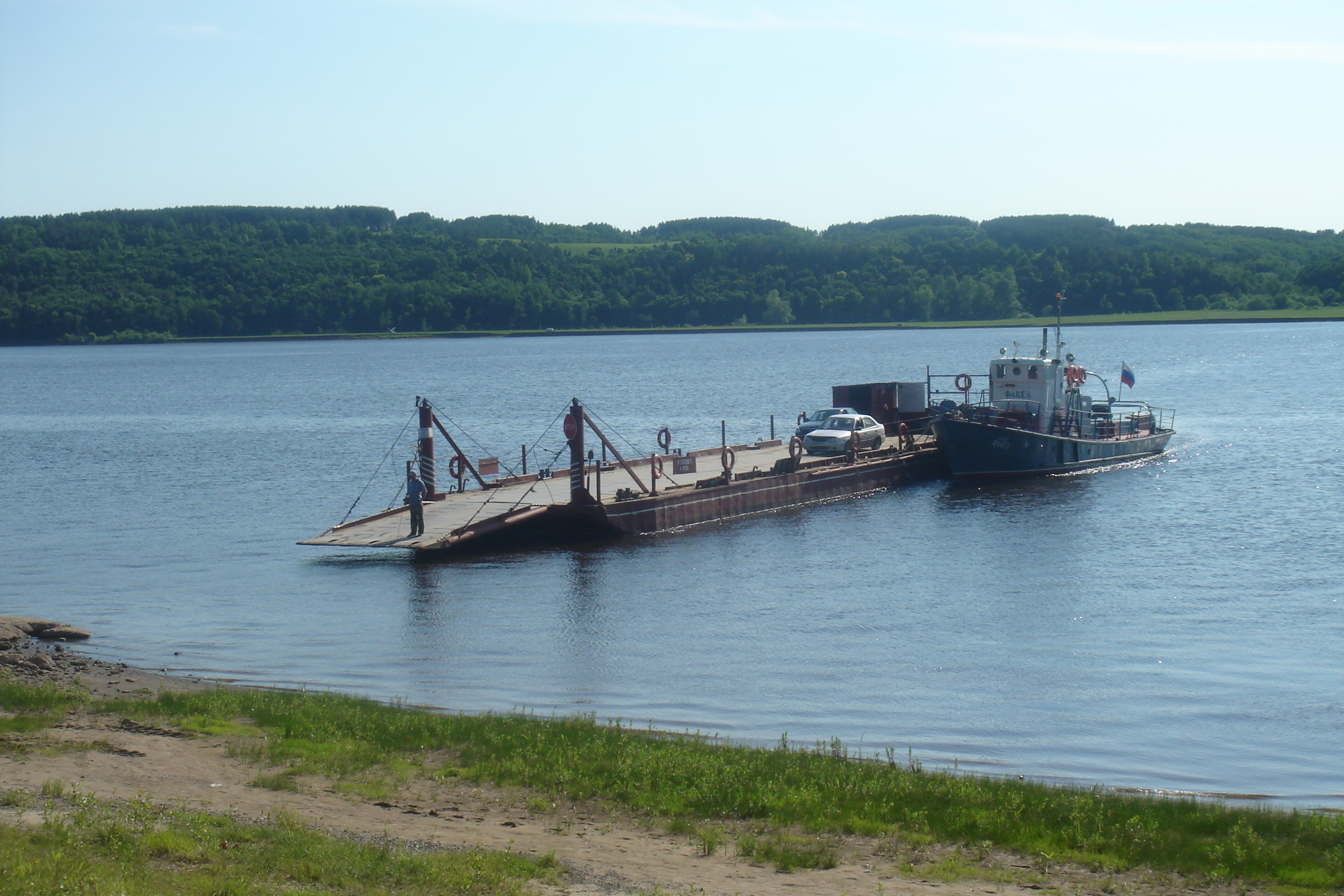
- A ferry in Kambarka

- Flag Coat of arms
- Location of Kambarsky District in the Udmurt Republic
- Coordinates: 56°16′N 54°12′E
- Country: Russia
- Federal subject: Udmurt Republic
- Established: 23 January 1924
- Administrative center: Kambarka

Area
  - Total: 762.6 km^{2} (294.4 sq mi)

Population (2010 Census)
  - Total: 18,106
  - Density: 23.74/km^{2} (61.49/sq mi)
  - Urban: 60.9%
  - Rural: 39.1%

Administrative structure
  - Administrative divisions: 1 Towns of district significance, 7 Selsoviets
  - Inhabited localities: 1 cities/towns, 20 rural localities

Municipal structure
  - Municipally incorporated as: Kambarsky Municipal District
  - Municipal divisions: 1 urban settlements, 7 rural settlements
- Time zone: UTC+4 (MSK+1)
- OKTMO ID: 94620000
- Website: http://www.kamrayon.ru/

Kambarsky District (Russian: Камба́рский райо́н; Udmurt: Камбарка ёрос, Kambarka joros) is an administrative and municipal district (raion), one of the twenty-five in the Udmurt Republic, Russia. It is located in the southeast of the republic. The area of the district is 762.6 square kilometers (294.4 sq mi). Its administrative center is the town of Kambarka. Population: 18,106 (2010 census); 21,243 (2002 Census); 22,680 (1989 Soviet census). The population of Kambarka accounts for 60.9% of the district's total population.
