= Glazov =

Town in the Udmurt Republic, Russia

Glazov Глазов
- Town

Other transcription(s)
  - Udmurt: Глаз
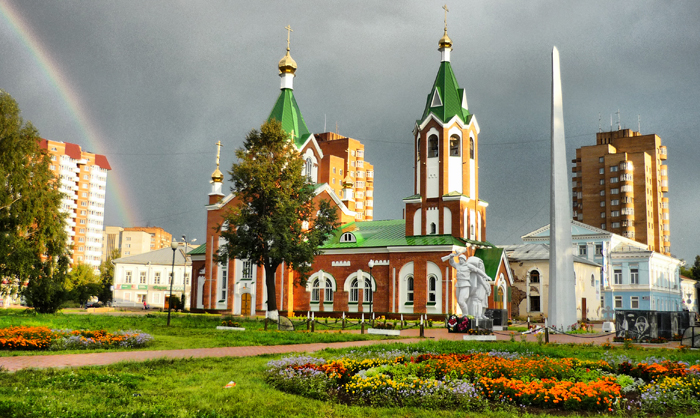
- View of Glazov

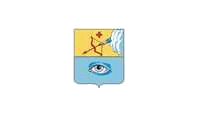
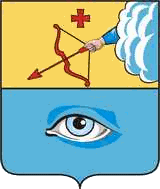
- Flag Coat of arms
- Interactive map of Glazov
- Location of Glazov Glazov (Udmurt Republic)
- Coordinates: 58°08′N 52°40′E
- Country: Russia
- Federal subject: Udmurtia
- First mentioned: 17th century
- Town status since: 1780

Government
  - Head: Alexander Vershinin
- Elevation: 150 m (490 ft)

Population (2010 Census)
  - Total: 95,854
  - Estimate (2025): 85,340 (−11%)
  - Rank: 179th in 2010

Administrative status
  - Subordinated to: town of republic significance of Glazov
  - Capital of: town of republic significance of Glazov, Glazovsky District

Municipal status
  - Urban okrug: Glazov Urban Okrug
  - Capital of: Glazov Urban Okrug, Glazovsky Municipal District
- Time zone: UTC+4 (MSK+1)
- Postal codes: 427620–427622, 427624–427632, 427649
- Dialing code: +7 34141
- OKTMO ID: 94720000001
- Website: www.glazov-gov.ru

Glazov (Russian: Глазов, IPA: [ˈɡlazəf]; Udmurt: Глаз, romanized: Glaz) is a town in the Udmurt Republic, Russia, located along the Trans-Siberian Railway, on the Cheptsa River. Population: 95,854 (2010 census); 100,894 (2002 census); 104,072 (1989 Soviet census).

== History ==
It was first mentioned in the 17th century chronicles as a village; town status was granted to it in 1780. During the Russian Civil War, the town was of considerable military importance. It was taken by Kolchak's general Anatoly Pepelyayev on 2 June 1919.

== Administrative and municipal status ==
Within the framework of administrative divisions, Glazov serves as the administrative center of Glazovsky District, even though it is not a part of it. As an administrative division, it is incorporated separately as the town of republic significance of Glazov—an administrative unit with the status equal to that of the districts. As a municipal division, the town of republic significance of Glazov is incorporated as Glazov Urban Okrug.

== Economy ==
The town is known for Chepetsk Mechanical Works (Russian: Чепецкий механический завод), Russian main producer of uranium, zirconium, and calcium metals for nuclear power plants, military, and space technologies. Apart from machine-building, there are wood-working, clothing, and food industries.

== Education ==
There are five establishments of higher education in the town, notably Glazov State Pedagogical Institute named after Vladimir Korolenko and the Glazov branch of Izhevsk State Technical University.

== Notable people ==
- Olga Knipper, actress, wife of Anton Chekhov
- Vyacheslav Nagovitsyn, politician
- Tatyana Baramzina, Hero of the Soviet Union
- Elizaveta Tuktamysheva, figure skater
