= Kambarka =

Kambarka Камбарка
- Town

Other transcription(s)
  - Udmurt: Камбарка
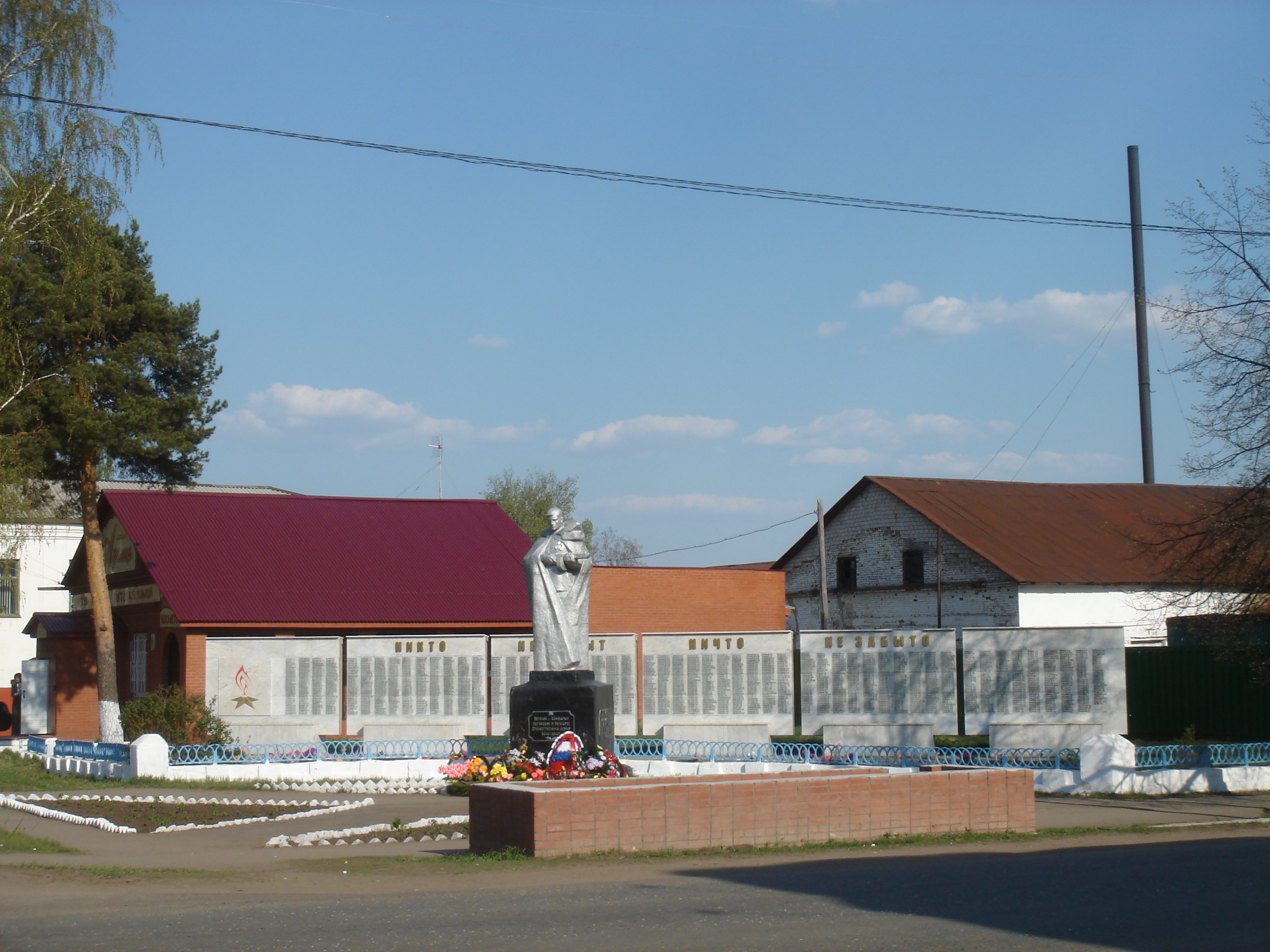
- A monument in Kambarka to the warriors fallen in the Great Patriotic War

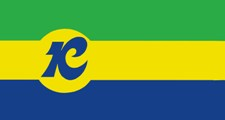
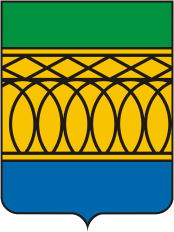
- Flag Coat of arms
- Interactive map of Kambarka
- Location of Kambarka Kambarka (Udmurt Republic)
- Coordinates: 56°16′N 54°13′E
- Country: Russia
- Federal subject: Udmurtia
- Administrative district: Kambarsky District
- Town of district significanceSelsoviet: Kambarka
- Founded: 1761–1767
- Town status since: 1945
- Elevation: 75 m (246 ft)

Population (2010 Census)
  - Total: 11,021
  - Estimate (2021): 10,080 (−8.5%)

Administrative status
  - Capital of: Kambarsky District, town of district significance of Kambarka

Municipal status
  - Municipal district: Kambarsky Municipal District
  - Urban settlement: Kambarskoye Urban Settlement
  - Capital of: Kambarsky Municipal District, Kambarskoye Urban Settlement
- Time zone: UTC+4 (MSK+1)
- Postal code: 427950–427959
- OKTMO ID: 94620101001

Kambarka (Russian: Камбарка) is a town and the administrative center of Kambarsky District of the Udmurt Republic, Russia, located on the Kambarka River (Kama's basin), 116 kilometers (72 mi) southeast of Izhevsk. Population: 11,021 (2010 census); 12,636 (2002 census); 13,258 (1989 Soviet census).

== History ==
It was founded as a settlement around a Demidov ironworks, which was constructed in 1761–1767. It was granted town status in 1945.

The city of Kambarka was one of the residence centers of the Udmurt Jews.

== Administrative and municipal status ==
Within the framework of administrative divisions, Kambarka serves as the administrative center of Kambarsky District. As an administrative division, it is incorporated within Kambarsky District as the town of district significance of Kambarka. As a municipal division, the town of district significance of Kambarka is incorporated within Kambarsky Municipal District as Kambarskoye Urban Settlement.

== Economy ==
Kambarka Engineering Works operates in the town. They mainly produce locomotives and other railway stock. Operates a chemical plant.

=== Chemical weapons destruction plant ===
A chemical weapons destruction plant was built in Kambarka during the Soviet times. This was in accordance to the obligations under the CWC to destroy all of the chemical weapon stockpiles by 2012.

== International relations ==
=== Twin towns and sister cities ===
On May 17, 2002, Mayor Georgy Kislov signed a Sister Cities International agreement with Mayor Charlie Roberts of the city of Tooele, Utah in the United States. As of 2022, Tooele, Utah is no longer in an agreement with the City of Kambarka due to the conflict between Russia and Ukraine.
