= Udmurt Autonomous Soviet Socialist Republic =

Autonomous republic of the Soviet Union

Udmurt Autonomous Soviet Socialist Republic Удмурт Автономной Советской Социалистической Республика (Udmurt) Удмуртская Автономная Советская Социалистическая Республика (Russian)
- ASSR of the Russian SFSR; Republic of the Russian Federation
- 1934–1992
- Flag (1978–1991) Emblem (1978–1992)

- Capital: Izhevsk
  - Type: Soviet republic
- History
  - Established: 28 December 1934
  - Sovereignty declared: 20 September 1990
  - Renamed to the Udmurt SSR: 24 May 1991
  - Renamed to the Udmurt Republic: 16 May 1992
Preceded by	Succeeded by
Udmurt AO	Udmurtia

The Udmurt Autonomous Soviet Socialist Republic was an autonomous republic of the Soviet Union, named after the Udmurt people. It originated on 4 November 1920 as the Votyak Autonomous Oblast ("Votyak" is an obsolete name for Udmurts, "Vot" being the obsolete name for Udmurt people) and renamed as the Udmurt Autonomous Oblast in 1932. On 28 December 1934, the oblast was organized as the Udmurt Autonomous Soviet Socialist Republic, but did not become a full member of the Russian Soviet Federative Socialist Republic until 1936.

In 1937, the Constitution of Udmurtia was created and the Supreme Soviet of the Udmurt Autonomous Soviet Socialist Republic gained power. The Supreme Council of Udmurtia declared state sovereignty on 20 September 1990 and the Udmurt ASSR was renamed as the Udmurt Republic on 16 May 1992.

== History ==
On 27 October 1917, the Bolsheviks gained power in Izhevsk and established a territorial government. The First Congress resolved to join the Russian Soviet Federative Socialist Republic in June 1918. In April 1919, Udmurtia was seized by Alexander Kolchak. The Red Army removed Kolchak from power 2 months later, in June 1919. In 1920, the Central Executive Committee and the Council of People's Commissars of the RSFSR established the Votskaya Autonomous Region. In 1932, the Votskaya Autonomous Region was renamed the Udmurt Autonomous Region. On 27 February 1921 the first Regional Communist Conference declared the territory to be an autonomous region.

Under the five-year plans from 1929 to 1940, Udmurtia became industrialised. By 1940, literature and professional art grew, and educational and scientific institutions were created. In March 1937 the Second Congress ratified the Udmurt constitution.

During World War II, the workers of Udmurtia produced weapons for the Red Army. Udmurtia produced 11,000,000 rifles and carbines in the war, surpassing Germany's industry output. Industrial factories were evacuated from Ukraine to Udmurtia, thus increasing the ethnic Russian population and stimulating economic growth. In 1969, oil plants were established in Udmurtia.

== See also ==
- Udmurt Republic
- Autonomous Republics of the Soviet Union
- Udmurt Regional Committee of the Communist Party of the Soviet Union
- Flag of the Udmurt Autonomous Soviet Socialist Republic
