= Udmurt Autonomous Oblast =

Autonomous oblast of the Soviet Union

Udmurt Autonomous Oblast, 1923

The Udmurt Autonomous Oblast (Russian: Удмуртская автономная область Udmurtskaja avtonomnaja oblast′; Udmurt: Удмурт автономи улос Udmurt avtonomi ulos) was formed on 4 November 1920 as the Votyak Autonomous Oblast (Russian: Вотская автономная область Votskaja avtonomnaja oblast′; Udmurt: Вотяк автономи улос Votjak avtonomi ulos), "Votyak" being an obsolete name for the Udmurt people. It was renamed Udmurt Autonomous Oblast on 1 January 1932 and was reorganized into the Udmurt ASSR on 28 December 1934. This became the Udmurt Republic on 20 September 1990.

== See also ==
- First Secretary of the Udmurt Communist Party
