= Cheptsa =

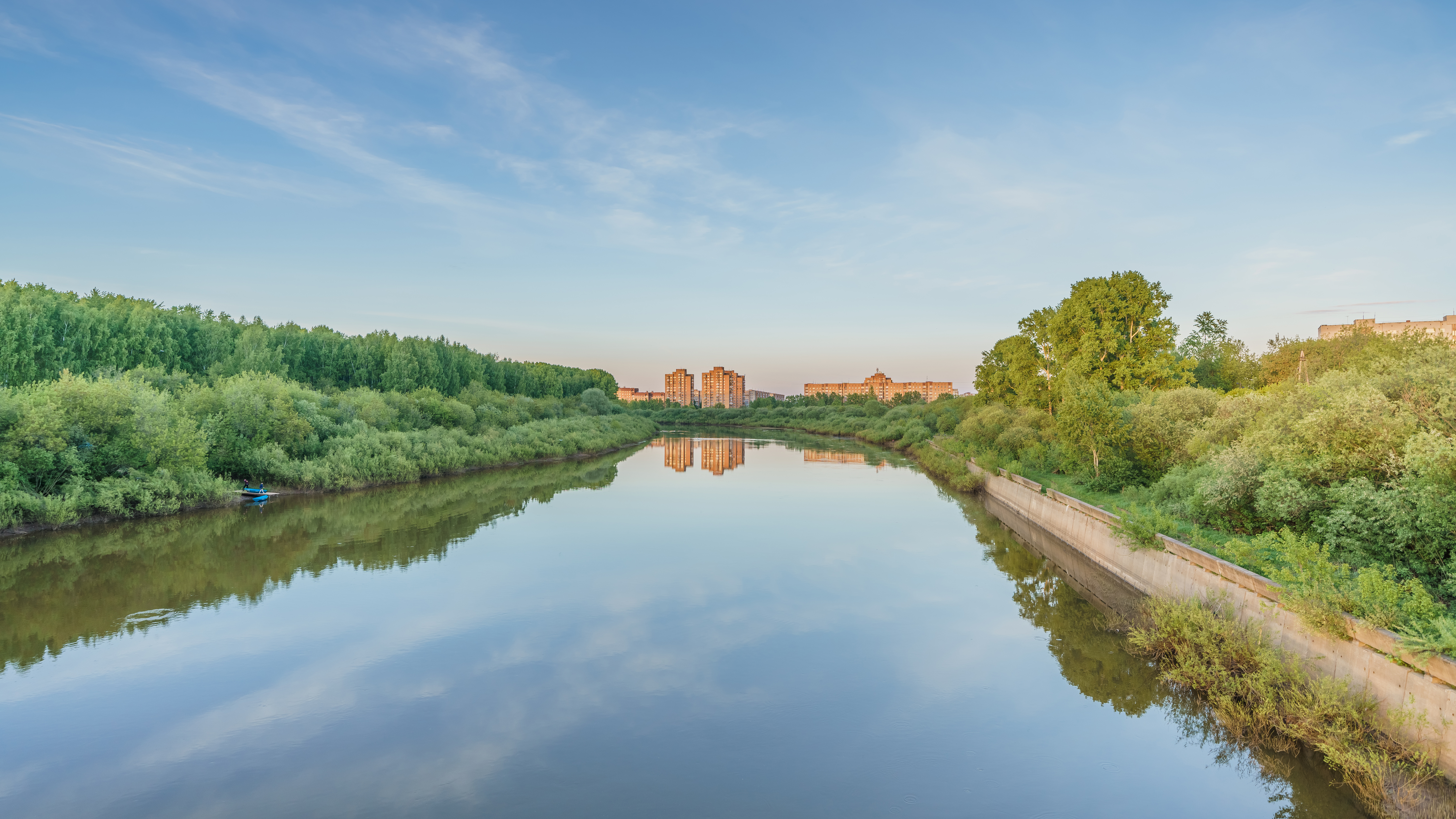
- The Cheptsa in Glazov
- Native name: Чепца (Russian)

Location
- Country: Russia

Physical characteristics
- Mouth: Vyatka
  - coordinates: 58°8′18″N 52°48′4″E
- Length: 501 km (311 mi)
- Basin size: 20,400 km^{2} (7,900 sq mi)

Basin features
- Progression: Vyatka→ Kama→ Volga→ Caspian Sea

The Cheptsa (Russian: Чепца; Udmurt: Чупчи) is a river in the north part of Udmurtian Republic (Udmurtia) and eastern Kirov Oblast, in Russia. It flows through the city Glazov and flows into the Vyatka in Kirovo-Chepetsk, east of Kirov. It is 501 kilometres (311 mi) long, and its drainage basin covers 20,400 square kilometres (7,900 mi^{2}).
