= Udmurts =

Permian ethnic group of Udmurtia, Russia

Udmurts Удмуртъёс
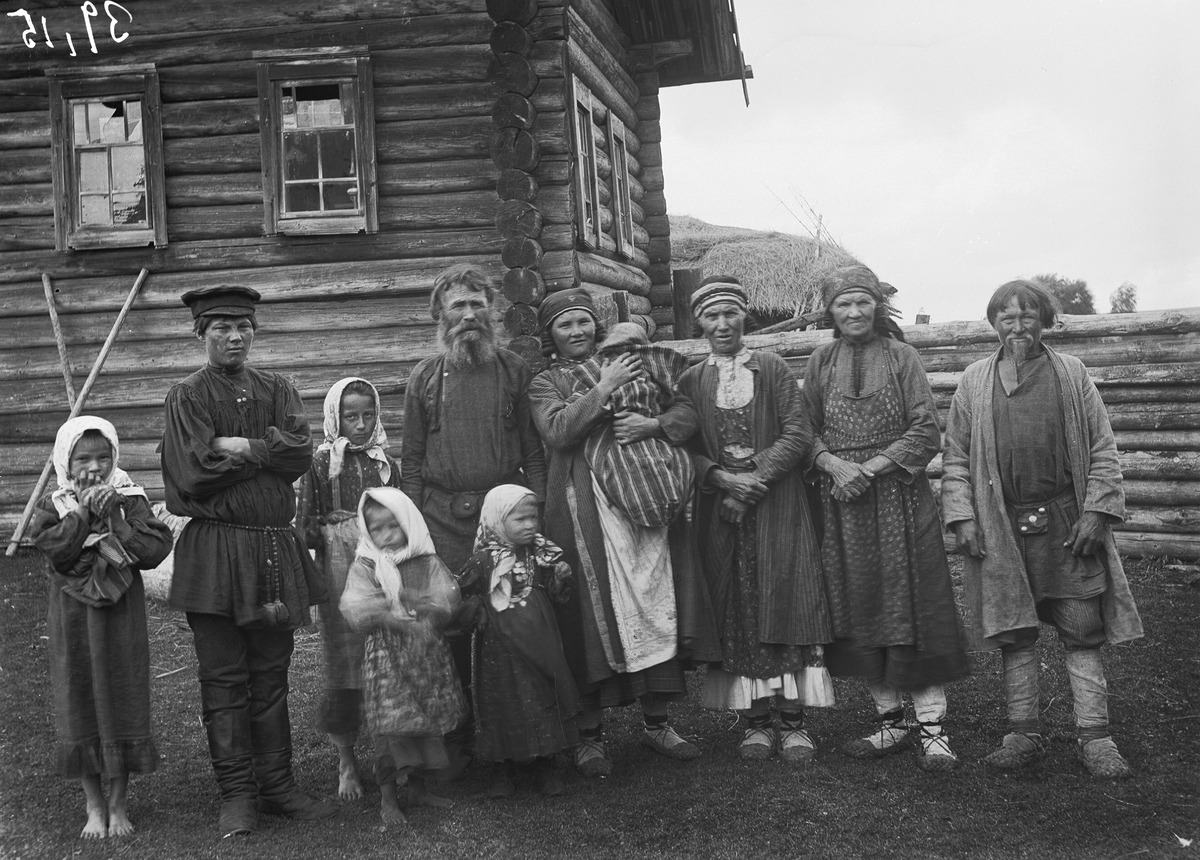
- Udmurts in 1907

Total population
- 396,000 (2021)

Regions with significant populations
- Russia: 386,465 (2021)
- Udmurtia: 299,874
- Kazakhstan: 5,824 (2009)
- Ukraine: 4,712 (2001)

Languages
- Udmurt, Russian

Religion
- Majority: Russian Orthodoxy; Minority: Udmurt Vos; Protestantism; Pentecostalism; Islam

Related ethnic groups
- Other Permians, especially Besermyan

The Udmurts (Udmurt: Удмуртъёс, Udmurtjos) are a Permian (Finno-Ugric) ethnic group in Eastern Europe, who speak the Udmurt language. They mainly live in the republic of Udmurtia in Russia. Udmurts make up 24.1% of the population of Udmurtia.

== Etymology ==
The name Udmurt comes from *odo-mort 'meadow people', from the Permic root *od(o) 'meadow, glade, turf, greenery' and murt 'person' (cf. Komi mort, Mari mari, Mordvin mirď-), probably an early borrowing from an Iranian language (such as Scythian): *mertä or *martiya meaning 'person, man' (cf. Persian mard). This, in turn, is thought to have been borrowed from the Indo-Aryan term *maryá- 'man', literally 'mortal, one who is bound to die' (< PIE *mer- 'to die'), compare Old Indic márya 'young warrior' and Old Indic marut 'chariot warrior', both connected specifically with horses and chariots. This is supported by a document dated 1557, in which the Udmurts are referred to as lugovye lyudi 'meadow people', alongside the traditional Russian name votyaki.

On the other hand, in the Russian tradition, the name 'meadow people' refers to the inhabitants of the left bank of a river in general. Most relevant in this regard is the recent theory proposed by V. V. Napolskikh and S. K. Belykh, who suppose that the ethnonym was borrowed from Proto-Iranian entirely: *anta-marta meaning 'resident of outskirts, border zone' (cf. Antes) → Proto-Permic *odə-mort → Udmurt udmurt.

Under the Russian Empire, Udmurts were mainly called by the exonyms Chud Otyatskaya (чудь отяцкая), Otyaks, Wotyaks or Votyaks. Today these names are considered offensive by Udmurts themselves and are mainly used against those who have forgotten the Udmurt language. The Udmurts are closely related to Komis to their north, both linguistically and culturally.

== Distribution ==
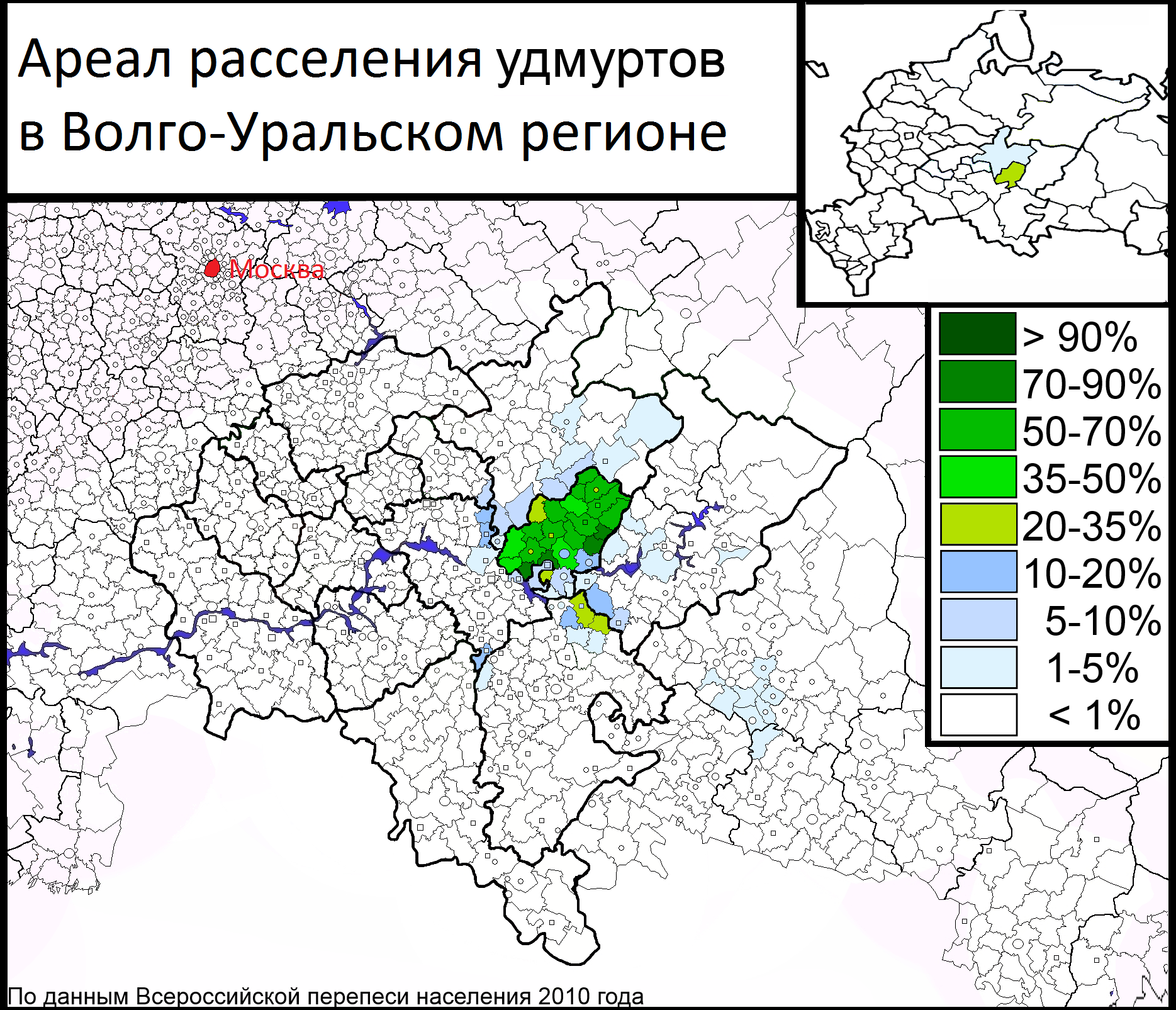
Udmurt resettlement area in the Idel-Ural (Volga-Ural) region (data based on the 2010 Russian Census

Most Udmurt people live in Udmurtia. Small groups live in the neighboring areas of Kirov Oblast and Perm Krai, Bashkortostan, Tatarstan, and Mari El.

The Udmurt population is shrinking; the Russian Census reported 552,299 in 2010, down from the 2002 Russian census figure of 637,000, in turn down from 746,562 in 1989. The 2021 census counted fewer Udmurts than had the 1926 census.

Udmurts in Russia (1926–2021)
Census	1926	1939	1959	1970	1979	1989	2002	2010	2021
Population	503,970	599,893	615,640	678,393	685,718	714,883	636,906	552,299	386,465
Percentage	0.54%	0.55%	0.52%	0.52%	0.50%	0.49%	0.45%	0.40%	0.30%

== Culture ==
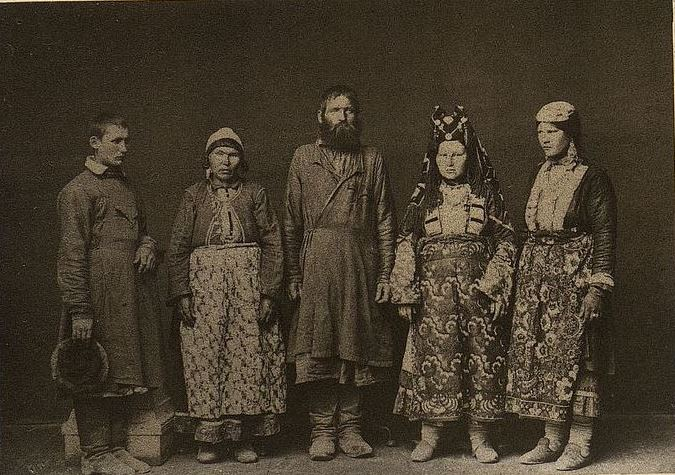
Udmurts wearing traditional outfits, 1870

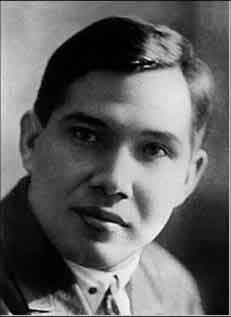
The Udmurt poet Kuzebay Gerd (1898–1937)

The Udmurt language belongs to the Uralic family.

The Udmurts have a national epic called Dorvyzhy. Their national musical instruments include the krez zither (similar to the Russian gusli) and a pipe-like wind instrument called the chipchirghan.

A chapter in the 1776 book Description de toutes les nations de l'empire de Russie is devoted to the description of the Wotyak people. James George Frazer also mentions a rite performed by the people in his book The Golden Bough.

Many Udmurt people have red hair, and a festival to celebrate the red-haired people has been held annually in Izhevsk since 2004.

The Udmurts used to be semi-nomadic forest dwellers that lived in riverside communities. However, most Udmurts now live in towns. Although the clan-based social structure of the Udmurts no longer exists, its traces are still strong and it continues to shape modern Udmurt culture.

== Genetics ==
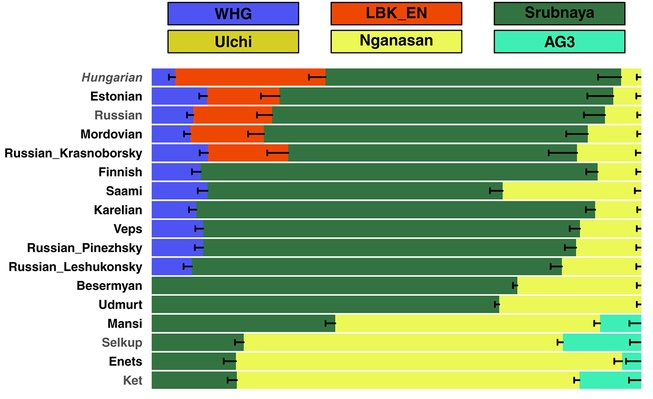
Estimated ancestry components among selected Eurasian populations. The yellow component represents Neo-Siberian ancestry (represented by Nganasans).

According to the data gathered by Kristiina Tambets and others (2018), the majority (about 70%) of Udmurt men carry the haplogroup N. The high frequency of this East Eurasian-related haplogroup is a common pattern among Uralic-speaking peoples. Most Udmurt men belong to the subclade N1c and 16.8 percent of them belong the subclade N1b-P43. The second most common Y-DNA haplogroup among Udmurts is R1a (19%). In another sample, Udmurts were found to be predominated by R1a-m17 at 37.2% and R1-M173 at 11.6, followed by various clades of N at about 34.9% and the rest constituted by E-M35, I-M170, G and J.

The most common maternal haplogroup for Udmurts is U (23.5%). Most Udmurts who have it belong to its subclades U2 (10.4%) and U5 (9.3%). Nearly as common is H (22.5%). Other mtDNA haplogroups among Udmurts include T (16.5%), D (11%) and Z (6%).

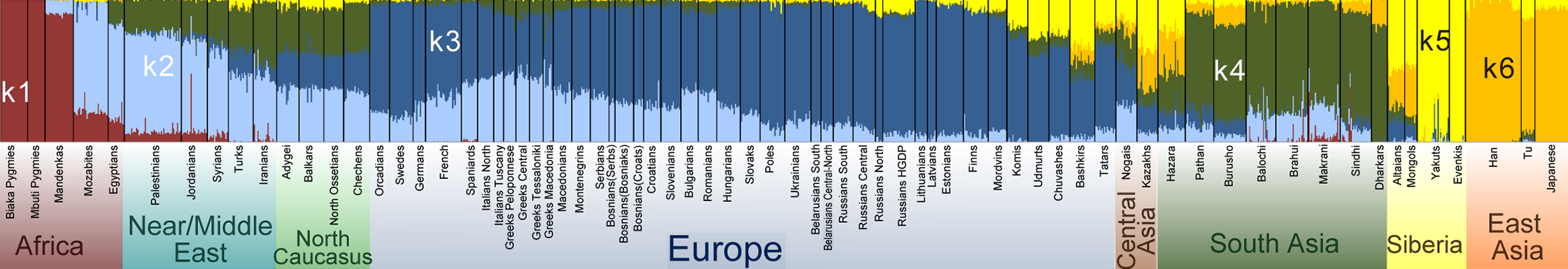
Autosomal ancestry proportions of Udmurts and other populations.

A sample also found Udmurts to have a high proportion (40.7%) of East Eurasian mtDNA, represented mostly by clades of M and D, which is common in groups in the Volga-Ural region of European Russia.

When it comes to the autosomal ancestry of Udmurts, around 30 percent of it is Nganasan-like. This Siberian component is typical for Uralic-speaking peoples. The rest can be modelled to be mostly Steppe-like with a smaller eastern hunter-gatherer component, or Srubnaya-like. It is common for peoples in northeastern Europe to have a high level of Steppe-related admixture.

== See also ==
- Besermyan (considered a subgroup of the Udmurts)
