= Udmurtia =

First-level administrative division of Russia

Udmurt Republic Удмуртская Республика (Russian)
- Republic

Other transcription(s)
  - Udmurt: Удмурт Элькун
- Flag Coat of arms
- Anthem: National Anthem of the Udmurt Republic
- Interactive map of Udmurt Republic
- Location within European Russia
- Coordinates: 57°17′N 52°45′E
- Country: Russia
- Federal district: Volga
- Economic region: Ural
- Established: 4 November 1920
- Capital: Izhevsk

Government
  - Body: State Council
  - Head: Olga Abramova (acting)

Area
  - Total: 42,061 km^{2} (16,240 sq mi)

Population (2021 census)
  - Total: 1,452,914: 24.1% Udmurts; 67.7% Russians; 5.5% Tatars; 0.2% Besermyan; 2.5% other
  - Estimate (2018): 1,513,044
  - Rank: 32nd
  - Density: 34.543/km^{2} (89.466/sq mi)
  - Urban: 65.7%
  - Rural: 34.3%

GDP (nominal, 2024)
  - Total: ₽1.4 trillion (US$19.04 billion)
  - Per capita: ₽979,471 (US$13,299)
- Time zone: UTC+4 (MSK+1)
- ISO 3166 code: RU-UD
- License plates: 18
- OKTMO ID: 94000000
- Official languages: Russian; Udmurt
- Website: http://www.udmurt.ru/en/

Udmurtia, (Note: /ʊdˈmʊərtiə/; Russian: Удмуртия, romanized: Udmurtiya [ʊˈdmurtʲɪjə]; Udmurt: Удмуртия, romanized: Udmurtija) officially the Udmurt Republic, (Note: Russian: Удмуртская Республика, romanized: Udmurtskaya Respublika, Udmurt: Удмурт Республика/Элькун, romanized: Udmurt Respublika/Eľkun) is a republic of Russia located in Eastern Europe. It is administratively part of the Volga Federal District. Its capital is the city of Izhevsk.

It was established as the Udmurt Autonomous Region (until 1931, the Votskaya Autonomous Region) on November 4, 1920.

== Name ==
The name Udmurt comes from odo-mort ('meadow people'), where the first part represents the Permic root od or odo ('meadow, glade, turf, greenery'). This is supported by a document dated 1557, in which the Udmurts are referred to as lugovye lyudi ('meadow people'), alongside the traditional Russian name otyaki.

The second part murt means 'person' (cf. Komi mort, Mari mari). It is probably an early borrowing from a Scythian language mertä or martiya ('person, man'; Sanskrit: Manus or Manushya), which is thought to have been borrowed from the Indo-Aryan term maryá- ('man, mortal, one who is bound to die'. cf. Old Indic márya ('young warrior') and marut ('chariot warrior'), both connected specifically with horses and chariots. The Indo-Europeanists T. Gamkrelidze and V. Ivanov associate this word with horse-riding Altaic tribes in the Bronze Age.

On the other hand, in the Russian tradition, the name 'meadow people' refers to the inhabitants of the left bank of river in particular. Recently, the most relevant is the version of V. V. Napolskikh and S. K. Belykh. They suppose that ethnonym was borrowed either from Indo-Iranian *anta 'outside, close, last, edge, limit, boundary' or Turkic-Altaic *anda/*ant 'oath (in fidelity), comrade, friend'.

== History ==
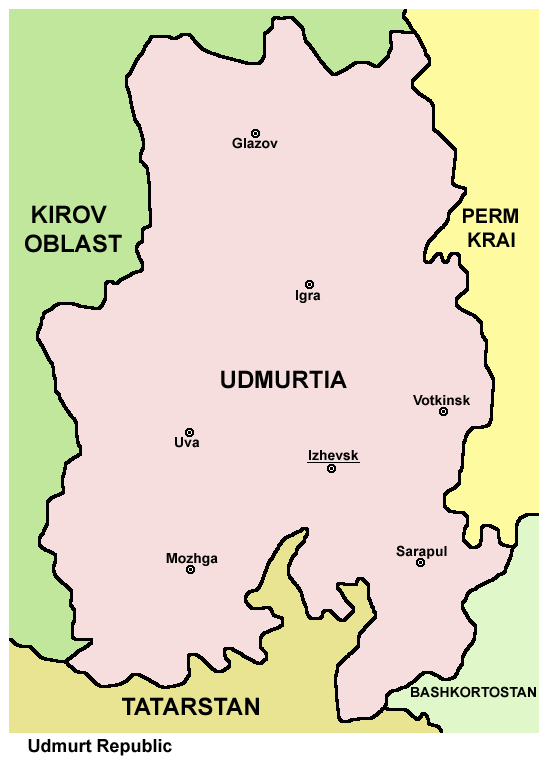
Map of the Udmurt Republic.

On November 4, 1920, the Votyak Autonomous Oblast was formed. On January 1, 1932, it was renamed Udmurt Autonomous Oblast, which was then reorganized into the Udmurt ASSR on December 28, 1934. During World War II, many industrial factories were evacuated from the Ukrainian SSR and western borderlands to Udmurtia.

On October 11, 1991, the Supreme Council of the Udmurt ASSR adopted a law according to which the Udmurt ASSR acquired a new name — the Udmurt Republic.

== Geography ==
The republic is located to the west of the Ural Mountains and borders Kirov, Perm, Bashkortostan, and Tatarstan.

Udmurtia is a republic in the Russian Federation, located in Central Russia between the branches of the rivers Kama and its right tributary the Vyatka.

The city of Izhevsk is the administrative, industrial, and cultural center of Udmurtia. Geographically, it is located not far from Moscow, the capital and largest city of the Russian Federation. The city has a well-developed transport system (including air, land, and water).

Udmurtia borders Kirov Oblast to the west and north, Perm Oblast to the east, and the Bashkortostan and Tatarstan Republics to the south.

=== Climate ===
The republic has a moderate continental climate, with warm summers and cold, snowy winters. Annual precipitation averages 400–600 mm.

Average temperatures
Month	Average temperature
January	−14.5 °C (5.9 °F)
July	+18.3 °C (64.9 °F)

== Demographics ==
Population: 1,452,914 (2021 census); 1,521,420 (2010 census); 1,570,316 (2002 census); 1,609,003 (1989 Soviet census).

Although as of 2007 the population was declining, the decline was stabilizing and was more pronounced in urban areas. Out of the 19,667 births reported in 2007, 12,631 were in urban areas (11.86 per 1,000) and 7,036 were in rural areas (14.88 per 1,000). Birth rates for rural areas are 25% higher than that of urban areas. Of the total of 21,727 deaths, 14,366 were reported in urban areas (13.49 per 1,000) and 7,361 were in rural areas (15.56 per 1,000). Natural decline of the population was measured at −0.16% for urban areas and an insignificant −0.07% for rural areas (the average for Russia was −0.33% in 2007).

=== Settlements ===
Largest cities or towns in Udmurtia 2010 Russian Census
Rank		Administrative Division	Pop.
1	Izhevsk	City of republic significance of Izhevsk	627,734
2	Sarapul	City of republic significance of Sarapul	101,381
3	Votkinsk	Votkinsky District	99,022
4	Glazov	Glazovsky District	95,854
5	Mozhga	Mozhginsky District	47,961
6	Igra	Igrinsky District	20,737
7	Uva	Uvinsky District	19,984
8	Balezino	Balezinsky District	16,121
9	Kez	Kezsky District	11,080
10	Kambarka	Kambarsky District	11,021

Historical population
Year	Pop.	±%
1926	756,264	—
1939	1,219,350	+61.2%
1959	1,336,927	+9.6%
1970	1,417,675	+6.0%
1979	1,493,670	+5.4%
1989	1,609,003	+7.7%
2002	1,570,316	−2.4%
2010	1,521,420	−3.1%
2021	1,452,914	−4.5%
Source: Census data

=== Vital statistics ===
	Average population (× 1,000)	Live births	Deaths	Natural change	Crude birth rate (per 1,000)	Crude death rate (per 1,000)	Natural change (per 1,000)	Total fertility rate
1970	1,421	23,286	13,265	10,021	16.4	9.3	7.1	
1975	1,459	26,497	14,666	11,831	18.2	10.1	8.1	
1980	1,508	27,601	16,862	10,739	18.3	11.2	7.1	
1985	1,562	29,343	17,553	11,790	18.8	11.2	7.5	
1990	1,614	24,345	15,816	8,529	15.1	9.8	5.3	2.04
1991	1,619	22,213	16,002	6,211	13.7	9.9	3.8	1.90
1992	1,623	20,074	18,063	2,011	12.4	11.1	1.2	1.73
1993	1,622	17,126	21,923	−4,797	10.6	13.5	−3.0	1.48
1994	1,619	16,874	24,183	−7,309	10.4	14.9	−4.5	1.45
1995	1,615	15,484	22,445	−6,961	9.6	13.9	−4.3	1.32
1996	1,610	14,877	20,641	−5,764	9.2	12.8	−3.6	1.26
1997	1,606	15,368	19,881	−4,513	9.6	12.4	−2.8	1.30
1998	1,603	16,130	19,080	−2,950	10.1	11.9	−1.8	1.36
1999	1,598	15,793	20,745	−4,952	9.9	13.0	−3.1	1.32
2000	1,592	16,256	21,852	−5,596	10.2	13.7	−3.5	1.36
2001	1,583	16,636	22,810	−6,174	10.5	14.4	−3.9	1.38
2002	1,572	17,746	24,520	−6,774	11.3	15.6	−4.3	1.46
2003	1,561	17,982	24,571	−6,589	11.5	15.7	−4.2	1.47
2004	1,552	18,238	23,994	−5,756	11.7	15.5	−3.7	1.47
2005	1,543	17,190	24,006	−6,816	11.1	15.6	−4.4	1.38
2006	1,535	17,480	22,011	−4,531	11.4	14.3	−3.0	1.40
2007	1,529	19,667	21,727	−2,060	12.9	14.2	−1.3	1.57
2008	1,525	20,421	21,436	−1,015	13.4	14.1	−0.7	1.65
2009	1,523	21,109	20,227	882	13.9	13.3	0.6	1.71
2010	1,522	21,684	21,100	584	14.3	13.9	0.4	1.78
2011	1,519	21,905	20,358	1,547	14.4	13.4	1.0	1.83
2012	1,518	23,225	19,526	3,699	15.3	12.9	2.4	1.98
2013	1,517	22,138	19,332	2,806	14.6	12.7	1.9	1.92
2014	1,517	22,060	19,461	2,599	14.5	12.8	1.7	1.96
2015	1,517	22,195	19,533	2,662	14.6	12.9	1.7	2.01
2016	1,517	21,024	19,090	1,934	13.8	12.6	1.2	1.96
2017	1,515	17,954	18,130	−176	11.9	12.0	-0.1	1.72

TFR source

=== Ethnic groups ===
According to the 2021 Census, Russians make up 67.7% of the republic's population, while the ethnic Udmurts make up only 24.1%. Other groups include Tatars (5.5%), Mari (0.5%), Ukrainians (0.3%), and a host of smaller groups, each accounting for less than 0.5% of the republic's total population.

Ethnic group	1926 Census		1970 Census		1979 Census		1989 Census		2002 Census		2010 Census		2021 Census	
Ethnic group	Number	%	Number	%	Number	%	Number	%	Number	%	Number	%	Number	%
Udmurts	395,607	52.3%	484,168	34.2%	479,702	32.1%	496,522	30.9%	460,584	29.3%	410,584	28.0%	299,874	24.1%
Besermyan	9,200	1.2%	484,168	34.2%	479,702	32.1%	496,522	30.9%	2,998	0.2%	2,111	0.1%	1,903	0.2%
Russians	327,493	43.3%	809,563	57.1%	870,270	58.3%	945,216	58.9%	944,108	60.1%	912,539	62.2%	841,581	67.7%
Tatars	17,135	2.3%	87,150	6.1%	99,139	6.6%	110,490	6.9%	109,218	7.0%	98,831	6.7%	67,964	5.5%
Others	6,781	0.9%	36,794	2.6%	43,061	2.9%	53,435	3.3%	53,408	3.4%	42,558	2.9%	31,540	2.5%
^{1} 210,052 people were registered from administrative databases, and could not declare an ethnicity. It is estimated that the proportion of ethnicities in this group is the same as that of the declared group.

As of 2013, over two-thirds of all Udmurts lived in the republic.

=== Religious groups ===
Religion in Udmurtia as of 2012 (Sreda Arena Atlas)
Russian Orthodoxy	33.1%
Other Orthodox	2.4%
Old Believers	0.9%
Protestantism	1.4%
Other Christians	5.3%
Islam	4.3%
Rodnovery and other native faiths	1.5%
Spiritual but not religious	29%
Atheism and irreligion	19.1%
Other and undeclared	3%

According to a 2012 survey, 33.1% of the population of Udmurtia adheres to the Russian Orthodox Church, 5% are unaffiliated generic Christians, 2% are Eastern Orthodox Christian believers without belonging to any church or members of other Eastern Orthodox churches, 4% are Muslims, 2% of the population adheres to the Slavic native faith (Rodnovery) or to Udmurt Vos (Udmurt native faith), 1% adheres to forms of Protestantism, and 1% of the population are Old Believers. In addition, 29% of the population declares to be "spiritual but not religious," 19% is atheist, and 3.9% follows other religions or did not give an answer to the question.

The local Russian Orthodox Church is the Metropolitanate of Udmurtia, comprising the Eparchy of Izhevsk (founded 1927) under Bishop and Metropolitan Viktorin (Kostenkov) (2015), the Eparchy of Glazov (founded 1889) under Bishop Viktor (Sergeyev), and the Eparchy of Sarapul (founded 1868) under Bishop Anthony (Prostikhin) (2015).

==== Jews ====
Udmurt Jews are a special territorial group of the Ashkenazi Jews, which started to be formed in the residential areas of mixed Turkic-speaking (Tatars, Kryashens, Bashkirs, Chuvash people), Finno-Ugric-speaking (Udmurts, Mari people) and Slavic-speaking (Russians) population. The Ashkenazi Jews on the territory of the Udmurt Republic first appeared in the 1830s. The Udmurt Jewry had formed the local variety on the base of the Yiddish of Udmurtia till the 1930s and features of Yiddish of migrants "joined" into it (in the 1930s and 1940s); as a result up to the 1970s and 1980s the Udmurt variety of Yiddish (Udmurtish) was divided into two linguistic subgroups: the central subgroup (with centers Izhevsk, Sarapul, and Votkinsk) and the southern subgroup (with centers Kambarka, Alnashi, Agryz, and Naberezhnye Chelny). One of the characteristic features of the Udmurtish is a noticeable number of Udmurt and Tatar loan words.

== Culture ==
Udmurt folklore is understood both in a broad sense (kalyk oner, kalyk todon-valan, kalyk viz – folk knowledge, folk wisdom), and in a narrower one (kalyk kylos, kalyk kylburet – folk poetry, oral poetry). In everyday life, folklore is not divided into genres, it is perceived in unity with material culture, with religious, legal, and ethical aspects. Popular terms-definitions have incorporated the ritual action (syam, nerge, yilol, kiston, kuyaskon, syuan, madiskon), symbolically figurative and magically forming words (madkyl, vyzhykyl, tunkyl, kylbur), musical and choreographic behavior (krez, gur, shudon-serekyan, thatchan, ecton).

== Sources ==
- №663-XII 7 декабря 1994 г. «Конституция Удмуртской Республики», в ред. Закона №62-РЗ от 22 ноября 2007 г. (#663-XII December 7, 1994 Constitution of the Udmurt Republic, as amended by the Law #62-RZ of November 22, 2007. ).
- "СССР. Административно-территориальное деление союзных республик. 1987." (USSR. Administrative-Territorial Structure of the Union Republics. 1987) / Составители В. А. Дударев, Н. А. Евсеева. — М.: Изд-во «Известия Советов народных депутатов СССР», 1987. — 673 с.
