= Naberezhnye Chelny constituency =

Naberezhnye Chelny single-member constituency
- Constituency of the Russian State Duma
- Deputy: Alfiya Kogogina; United Russia
- Federal subject: Republic of Tatarstan
- Districts: Agryzsky, Aktanyshsky, Mendeleyevsky, Menzelinsky, Naberezhnye Chelny, Tukayevsky
- Voters: 513,551 (2026)

The Naberezhnye Chelny constituency (No.34 (Note: No. 25 in 1993–1995 and in 2003-2007, No. 24 in 1995–2003, No.29 in 2016–2026)) is a Russian legislative constituency in Tatarstan. The constituency covers Naberezhnye Chelny and northeastern Tatarstan.

The constituency has been represented since 2016 by United Russia deputy Alfiya Kogogina, a four-term State Duma member, former KAMAZ executive and wife of KAMAZ general director Sergey Kogogin.

== Boundaries ==
1993–2007: Agryzsky District, Aktanyshsky District, Mendeleyevsky District, Menzelinsky District, Naberezhnye Chelny, Tukayevsky District, Yelabuga, Yelabuzhsky District
The constituency was centred on Naberezhnye Chelny, a major industrial centre which hosts KAMAZ auto plant, and north-eastern Tatarstan, including the towns of Mendeleyevsk and Yelabuga.

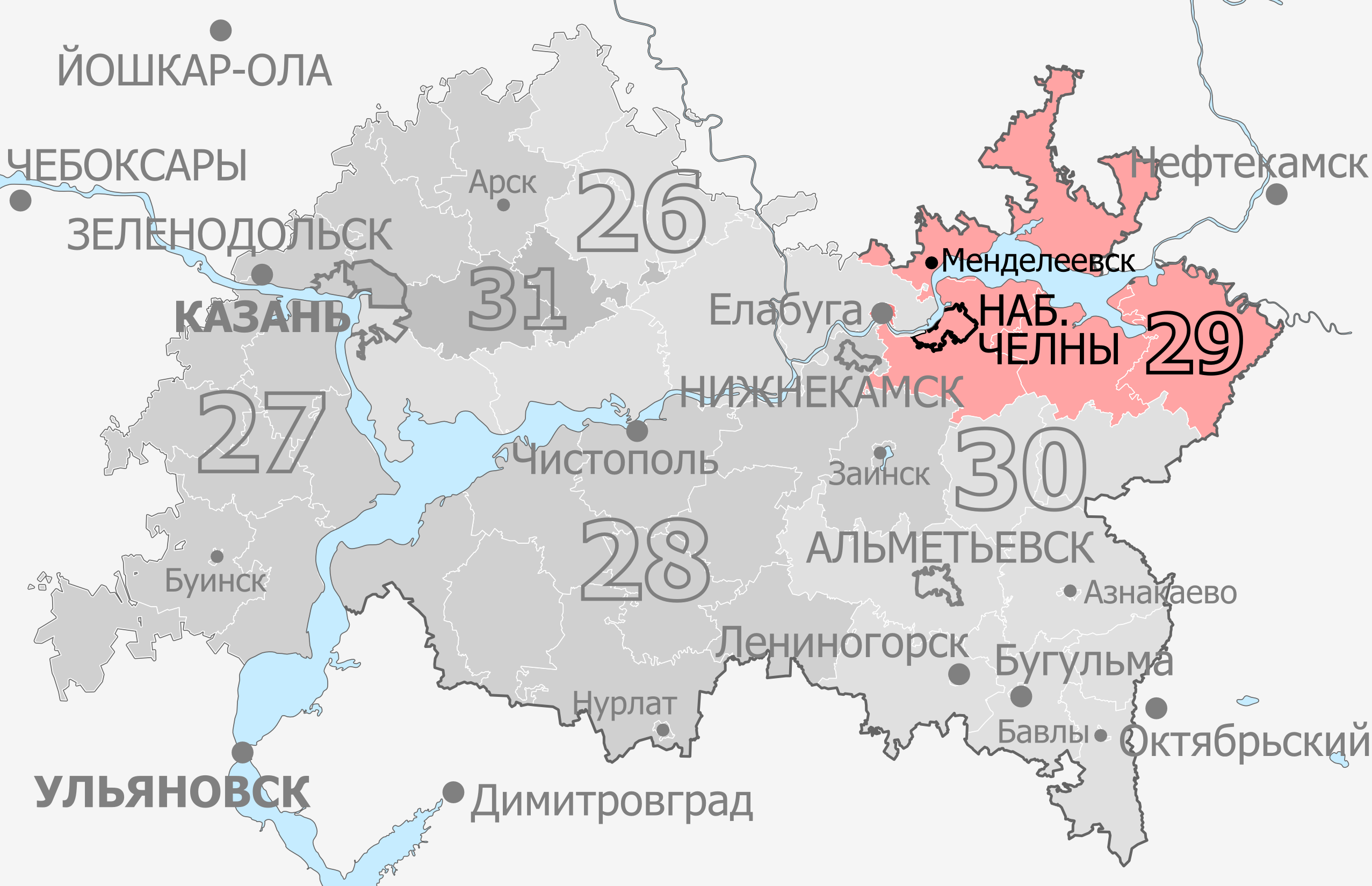
Constituency boundaries from 2016 to 2026

2016–2026: Agryzsky District, Aktanyshsky District, Mendeleyevsky District, Menzelinsky District, Naberezhnye Chelny, Tukayevsky District
The constituency was re-created for the 2016 election. This seat retained most of its 1993–2007 territory, losing only Yelabuzhsky District to Privolzhsky constituency.

2026–present: Agryzsky District, Aktanyshsky District, Mendeleyevsky District (Bizyaki, Izhyovka, Kamayevo, Mendeleyevsk, Monashevo, Munayka, Pseyevo, Staroye Grishkino, Tatarskiye Chelny, Tikhonovo, Toyguzino, Turayevo, Yenaberdino), Menzelinsky District, Naberezhnye Chelny, Tukayevsky District
After the 2025 redistricting the constituency was slightly altered, losing small parts of Mendeleyevsky District to Nizhnekamsk constituency.

== Members elected ==
Election	Member	Party
1993	Results were invalidated due to low turnout	
1994	Vladimir Altukhov	Independent
1995	Vladimir Altukhov	Independent
1999	Salimkhan Akhmetkhanov	Independent
2003	Oleg Morozov	United Russia
2007	Proportional representation—no election by constituency	
2011	Proportional representation—no election by constituency	
2016	Alfiya Kogogina	United Russia
2021	Alfiya Kogogina	United Russia
2026	Alfiya Kogogina	United Russia

== Election results ==
=== 1993 ===
Election was cancelled after only a single candidate, Yury Rostovshchikov (YaBL), registered prior to election day. A by-election was scheduled for March 1994.

==== Declared candidates ====
- Yury Rostovshchikov (YaBL), Deputy Chairman of the Kazan Vakhitovsky City District Council of People's Deputies (1990–present)

=== 1994 ===
==== Declared candidates ====
- Vladimir Altukhov (Independent), Member of Naberezhnye Chelny Avtozavodsky City District Council of People's Deputies (1990–present), businessman

==== Results ====
Summary of the 13 March 1994 by-election in the Naberezhnye Chelny constituency
Candidate	Party	Votes	%
Vladimir Altukhov	Independent	–	40.8%

=== 1995 ===
==== Declared candidates ====
- Vladimir Altukhov (Independent), incumbent Member of State Duma (1994–present)
- Nikolay Belov (SR ZhKKh), First Deputy Mayor of Yelabuga
- Dmitry Fomin (Yabloko), aide to State Duma member
- Marklen Fyodorov (CPRF), construction executive
- Nikolay Kolcherin (Independent), cooperative chairman
- Nikolay Tarakanov (Independent), military base commander

==== Results ====
Summary of the 17 December 1995 Russian legislative election in the Naberezhnye Chelny constituency
Candidate	Party	Votes	%
Vladimir Altukhov (incumbent)	Independent	84,137	30.45%
Marklen Fyodorov	Communist Party	60,643	21.95%
Nikolay Belov	Union of Workers of ZhKKh	28,957	10.48%
Dmitry Fomin	Yabloko	25,773	9.33%
Nikolay Kolcherin	Independent	23,000	8.32%
Nikolay Tarakanov	Independent	12,018	4.35%
against all		33,503	12.13%
Total		276,300	100%

=== 1999 ===
==== Declared candidates ====
- Salimkhan Akhmetkhanov (Independent), Member of State Council of the Republic of Tatarstan (1995–present), former People's Deputy of Russia (1990–1993), agriculture businessman
- Leonid Ivanov (Independent), businessman
- Gulfia Kashapova (ROS), aide to State Duma member
- Vladimir Kirillov (LDPR), physician
- Khafiz Mirgalimov (CPRF), construction executive
- Abuzar Mukhametgareyev (DN), businessman
- Ildar Urmanov (Independent), KAMAZ executive

==== Withdrawn candidates ====
- Fanil Nasirov (Independent)

==== Declined ====
- Vladimir Altukhov (NDR), incumbent Member of State Duma (1994–present) (ran on the party list)

==== Results ====
Summary of the 19 December 1999 Russian legislative election in the Naberezhnye Chelny constituency
Candidate	Party	Votes	%
Salimkhan Akhmetkhanov	Independent	106,462	27.06%
Vladimir Kirillov	Liberal Democratic Party	61,460	15.62%
Leonid Ivanov	Independent	56,130	14.27%
Khafiz Mirgalimov	Communist Party	44,694	11.36%
Ildar Urmanov	Independent	29,755	7.56%
Gulfia Kashapova	Russian All-People's Union	12,263	3.12%
Abuzar Mukhametgareyev	Spiritual Heritage	11,634	2.96%
against all		58,979	14.99%
Total		393,462	100%

=== 2003 ===
==== Declared candidates ====
- Valery Amzin (LDPR), party coordinator in Naberezhnye Chelny
- Rafail Asylov (Independent), engineer
- Fail Ibyatov (Independent), auto businessman
- Leonid Ivanov (Independent), Member of Naberezhnye Chelny City Council of People's Deputies, auto businessman, 1999 candidate for this seat
- Khafiz Mirgalimov (CPRF), construction executive, 1999 candidate for this seat
- Oleg Morozov (United Russia), Member of State Duma (1994–present), chairman of the Regions of Russia faction (1997–present)
- Bulat Yanborisov (PVR-RPZh), law firm director

==== Withdrawn candidates ====
- Valery Kubasov (ORP Rus'), corporate executive
- Lilia Valeyeva (Independent), Nizhnyaya Kama National Park deputy director

==== Did not file ====
- Natalya Imamova (Independent), entrepreneur
- Aleksandr Nikolayev (Independent), attorney
- Yelizaveta Romanova (Independent), homemaker
- Rafek Sadekov (Independent), electrical machine spinner
- Sergey Yeretnov (DPR), businessman

==== Declined ====
- Salimkhan Akhmetkhanov (NPRF), incumbent Member of State Duma (2000–present) (ran in the Almetyevsk constituency)

==== Results ====
Summary of the 7 December 2003 Russian legislative election in the Naberezhnye Chelny constituency
Candidate	Party	Votes	%
Oleg Morozov	United Russia	189,155	49.16%
Bulat Yanborisov	Party of Russia's Rebirth-Russian Party of Life	51,734	13.45%
Leonid Ivanov	Independent	29,259	7.60%
Khafiz Mirgalimov	Communist Party	27,639	7.18%
Fail Ibyatov	Independent	17,533	4.56%
Valery Amzin	Liberal Democratic Party	6,734	1.75%
Rafail Asylov	Independent	2,173	0.56%
against all		50,479	13.12%
Total		384,779	100%

=== 2016 ===
==== Declared candidates ====
- Ramil Abdulov (A Just Russia), pensioner
- Rafael Bayramov (LDPR), construction businessman
- Mansur Garifullin (CPRF), electrician
- Tatyana Guryeva (CPCR), former Member of Naberezhnye Chelny City Council (2010–2015), perennial candidate
- Alfiya Kogogina (United Russia), Member of State Duma (2011–present)
- Ruzil Mingalimov (PARNAS), Member of Naberezhnye Chelny City Council (2015–present), television journalism senior lecturer
- Rafail Nurutdinov (Rodina), former Member of State Council of the Republic of Tatarstan (2009–2014), nonprofit chairman

==== Failed to qualify ====
- Irina Pavperova (Independent), crane operator
- Oleg Ukrayev (Independent), unemployed
- Vladimir Yershov (Independent), pensioner

==== Results ====
Summary of the 18 September 2016 Russian legislative election in the Naberezhnye Chelny constituency
Candidate	Party	Votes	%
Alfiya Kogogina	United Russia	316,091	76.05%
Tatyana Guryeva	Communists of Russia	40,030	9.63%
Mansur Garifullin	Communist Party	15,532	3.74%
Ramil Abdulov	A Just Russia	13,795	3.32%
Rafael Bayramov	Liberal Democratic Party	12,129	2.92%
Rafail Nurutdinov	Rodina	8,441	2.03%
Ruzil Mingalimov	People's Freedom Party	7,240	1.74%
Total		415,622	100%

=== 2021 ===
==== Declared candidates ====
- Timur Bikmullin (RPPSS), neurosurgeon
- Aleksandr Bykov (New People), union leader
- Mansur Garifullin (CPRF), Member of State Council of the Republic of Tatarstan (2019–present), 2016 candidate for this seat
- Tatyana Guryeva (CPCR), Member of Naberezhnye Chelny City Council (2010–2015, 2020–present), perennial candidate, 2016 candidate for this seat
- Alfiya Kogogina (United Russia), incumbent Member of State Duma (2011–present)
- Andrey Kolosov (LDPR), Member of Pospelovo Council (2020–present), nonprofit executive
- Rashid Mavliyev (SR–ZP), Member of Starosheshminsk Council (2015–present), individual entrepreneur
- Ruslan Nigmatulin (Party of Growth), Member of Naberezhnye Chelny City Council (2020–present), businessman

==== Results ====
Summary of the 17–19 September 2021 Russian legislative election in the Naberezhnye Chelny constituency
Candidate	Party	Votes	%
Alfiya Kogogina (incumbent)	United Russia	285,818	67.28%
Tatyana Guryeva	Communists of Russia	51,844	12.20%
Mansur Garifullin	Communist Party	20,869	4.91%
Ruslan Nigmatulin	Party of Growth	15,927	3.75%
Andrey Kolosov	Liberal Democratic Party	15,062	3.55%
Rashid Mavliyev	A Just Russia — For Truth	12,064	2.84%
Aleksandr Bykov	New People	10,176	2.40%
Timur Bikmullin	Party of Pensioners	8,242	1.94%
Total		424,848	100%

=== 2026 ===
==== Declared candidates ====
- Aleksandr Bespalov (A Just Russia), manager
- Nail Ganiyev (New People), Member of Bogorodskoye Council (2025–present), lawyer
- Mansur Garifullin (CPRF), Member of State Council of the Republic of Tatarstan (2019–present), 2016 and 2021 candidate for this seat
- Ilsur Islamov (LDPR), Member of Tanayka Council (2025–present), medical businessman
- Alfiya Kogogina (United Russia), incumbent Member of State Duma (2011–present)

==== Withdrawn candidates ====
- Airat Gumerbayev (Yabloko), neurologist (disqualified August 31, 2026, due to possession of foreign stock)

==== Results ====
Summary of the 18-20 September 2026 Russian legislative election in the Naberezhnye Chelny constituency
Candidate	Party	Votes	%
Alfiya Kogogina (incumbent)	United Russia	297,481	76.74%
Mansur Garifullin	Communist Party	29,428	7.59%
Nail Ganiyev	New People	22,202	5.73%
Ilsur Islamov	Liberal Democratic Party	18,728	4.83%
Aleksandr Bespalov	A Just Russia	16,293	4.20%
Total		387,631	100%
