= Ushkov =

Ushkov (Russian: Ушков) is a Russian masculine surname, its feminine counterpart is Ushkova. It may refer to:

- Kapiton Ushkov (1813–1868), Russian chemical industrialist
- Konstantin K. Ushkov (1850–1918), Russian industrialist, son of Kapiton
- Konstantin Ushkov (born 1977), Russian swimmer

== See also ==
- Ushkova house in Kazan, Russia, named after a daughter-in-law of Konstantin K. Ushkov
