= Möxlisä Bubıy =

- Мөхлисә Габделгалләм кызы Нигъмәтуллина
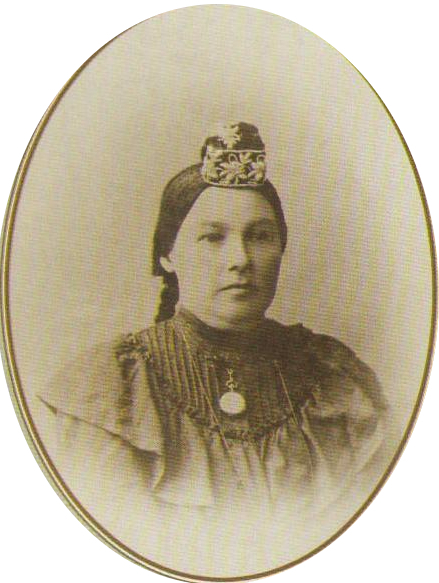
- Title: qadi

Personal life
- Born: Möxlisä Gabdelgallyamovna Nigmatullina; 1869 İj-Bubıy, Sarapulsky Uyezd, Vyatka Governorate, Russian Empire
- Died: December 23, 1937 (aged 67–68) Ufa, RSFSR, USSR
- Pen name: Möxlisä Bubıy

Religious life
- Religion: Islam

Muslim leader
- Period in office: from 1917

Möxlisä Buby (Tatar: Мөхлисә Буби (Мөхлисә Нигъмәтуллина); 1896 – December 23, 1937) was a Tatar and Muslim religious figure and a popular educator. She was the first female qadi (Islamic judge) in Russia.

== Biography ==
Möxlisä Gabdelgallyamovna Nigmatullina was born in 1869 in the village of İj-Bubiy, Sarapulsky Uyezd, Vyatka Governorate of the Russian Empire (now Agryzsky District of Tatarstan). She came from a family of hereditary scholars; her father founded a madrasa in their native village, which was later transformed into a modern school by his sons and Möxlisä's brothers, Gubaydulla and Gabdulla.

She received her education at the madrasa in her native village. Starting in 1895, she began teaching there. In 1901, Möxlisä, along with her brothers and their wives, Nasima and Khusnifatima, established a 6-year women's teacher training school in İj-Bubiy, where instruction was conducted in the Tatar language.

In 1905, she founded the "İj-Bubiy" madrasa for Muslim women, where she taught the fundamentals of Islam, as well as the languages and literature of Eastern peoples. The madrasa also offered instruction in pedagogy, mathematics, geography, history, physics, ethics, logic, and the Russian language.

On January 30, 1911, the gendarmes arrested the male teachers. The female teachers continued their work, but they were also arrested on January 18, 1912, and the madrasa's library was burned. Möxlisä Buby then moved to Troitsk in the Orenburg Governorate, where she headed a women's school. From 1913, she taught at a women's gymnasium. In 1914, with the funds provided by the merchants Yaushev, Möxlisä Bubıy established a women's teacher training seminary in Troitsk called "Darul-Mugallimat."

Möxlisä Bubıy participated in the First All-Russian Muslim Congress, which took place in Moscow from May 1 to 11, 1917, where she was elected as one of the six qadis (judges) of the Central Spiritual Administration of Muslims (CSAM). At this congress, decisions were made to ban polygamy, make the wearing of the hijab optional, and allow divorce initiated by the wife (known as "khula") without requiring evidence of the husband's failure. This was the first CSAM composition elected by the Muslims themselves, rather than appointed by the authorities, and it was the first to include a woman. Möxlisä Bubıy was re-elected in 1920, 1923, and 1926. While working in Ufa, she primarily handled legal cases from Muslims, led the family department of CSAM, and kept vital records. Additionally, from 1905 to 1917, she regularly wrote articles on women's issues for newspapers like "Ul'fat," "Akhbar," "Vaqyt," and journals such as "Syumbike" and "Islam Majallasy." Her views were based on the belief that Muslim women could and should achieve equality with men while maintaining morality and adhering to the principles of Islam.

She was repressed on charges of participating in the "Counter-Revolutionary Insurrectionist Nationalist Organization of Bashkiria." She was arrested on November 20, 1937, and was executed by shooting on December 23, 1937.

By a decision of the Presidium of the Supreme Court of the Bashkir ASSR on May 23, 1960, Möxlisä Bubıy was exonerated and rehabilitated.

== Legacy ==
- The Ministry of Science and Education of the Republic of Tatarstan has been conducting pedagogical readings named after Möxlisä Bubıy since 2012.
- The All-Russian scientific-practical conference "Möxlisä Bubıy Readings: The Role of Muslim Women in Enlightening and Humanizing Society" has been held.
- There is a Möxlisä Bubıy Prize awarded to women who contribute to preserving and developing the spiritual heritage of the Tatar people.
- The play "Үлеп яратты" by Rkail Zaydulla was performed at the Kamal Theatre in Kazan.
- In 2019, a scientific-practical conference was held in Ufa in memory of Möxlisä Bubıy and other notable figures.
