= Mendeleyevsky District =

Mendeleyevsky District Менделеевский район (Russian)
- District

Other transcription(s)
  - Tatar: Менделеевск районы
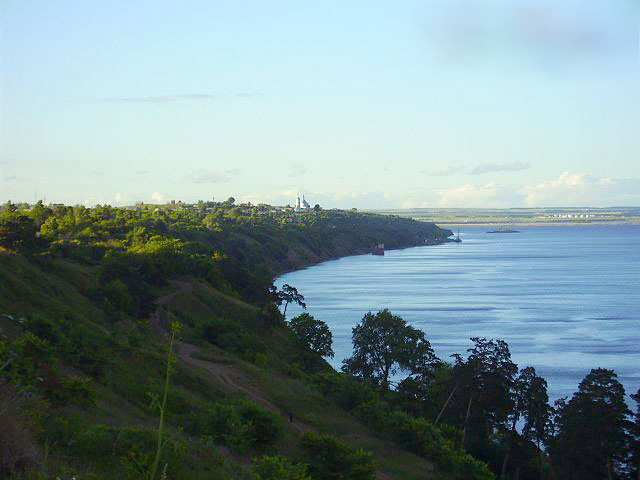
- Kama River, Mendeleyevsky District

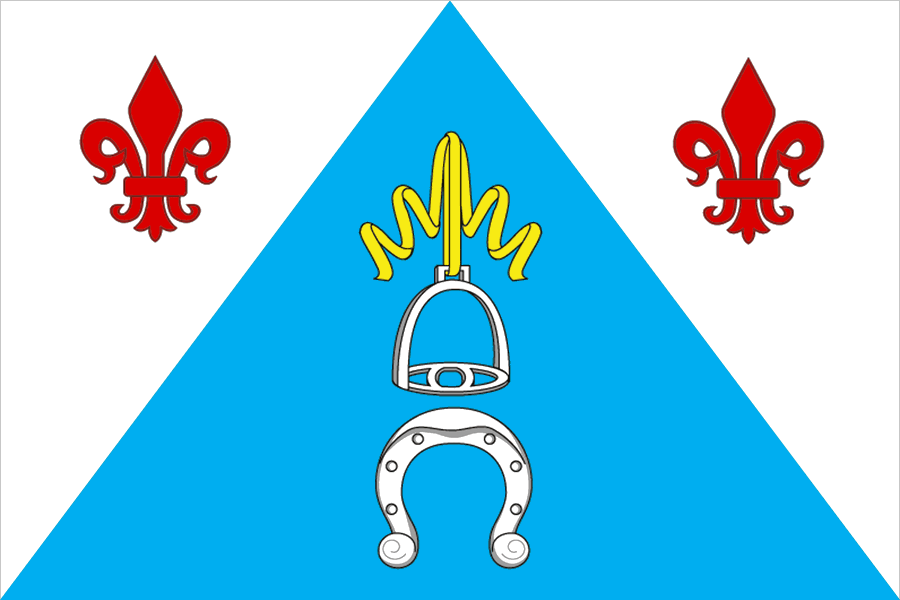
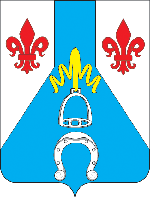
- Flag Coat of arms
- Location of Mendeleyevsky District in the Republic of Tatarstan
- Coordinates: 55°58′N 52°22′E
- Country: Russia
- Federal subject: Republic of Tatarstan
- Established: 1930
- Administrative center: Mendeleyevsk

Area
  - Total: 746.4 km^{2} (288.2 sq mi)

Population (2010 Census)
  - Total: 30,377
  - Density: 40.70/km^{2} (105.4/sq mi)
  - Urban: 72.7%
  - Rural: 27.3%

Administrative structure
  - Inhabited localities: 1 cities/towns, 35 rural localities

Municipal structure
  - Municipally incorporated as: Mendeleyevsky Municipal District
  - Municipal divisions: 1 urban settlements, 14 rural settlements
- Time zone: UTC+3 (MSK)
- OKTMO ID: 92639000
- Website: http://mendeleevsk.tatarstan.ru/

Mendeleyevsky District (Russian: Менделе́евский райо́н; Tatar: Менделеев районы) is a territorial administrative unit and municipal district of the Republic of Tatarstan within the Russian Federation. The district is located on the right bank of the Kama and on the Toyma River (a tributary of the Kama), 238 kilometers from Kazan. The administrative center of the district is Mendeleyevsk. At the beginning of 2020, the population of the district was 30,064.

The first settlements on the territory of the modern Mendeleevsky region appeared in the 17th century. The main impetus for the development of the region was the creation by Kapiton Ushkov in 1868 of a chemical plant, which for 2020 is a city-forming enterprise.

In 2019, TASED was created in Mendeleevsk, it became the fifth such industrial park in the Republic of Tatarstan. In 2020 the TASED counted six companies are residents.

== Geography ==
The Mendeleevsky municipal district borders on Udmurtia in the north, in the west on the Yelabuga, in the south on the Tukaevsky and in the east on the Agryz regions of the Republic of Tatarstan. The district occupies a total area of 746.4 km^{2}. The administrative center of the district is the city of Mendeleevsk.

== Coat of arms and flag ==
The Council of the Mendeleevsky Municipal District of the Republic of Tatarstan approved the modern coat of arms and flag on 5 March 2007. There is an azure chemistry flask on the silver (white) background of the coat of arms. There is a horseshoe and a stirrup inside of the flask. These elements are borrowed from the family coat of arms of the Mendeleev family. The chemistry flask represents the chemical industry as the leading branch of the regional economy. Lily flowers symbolize the natural wealth of the area. The azure color symbolizes the water resources as the district is located on the shore of the Kama Reservoir. The flag of the district is designed on the basis of the coat of arms.

== History ==
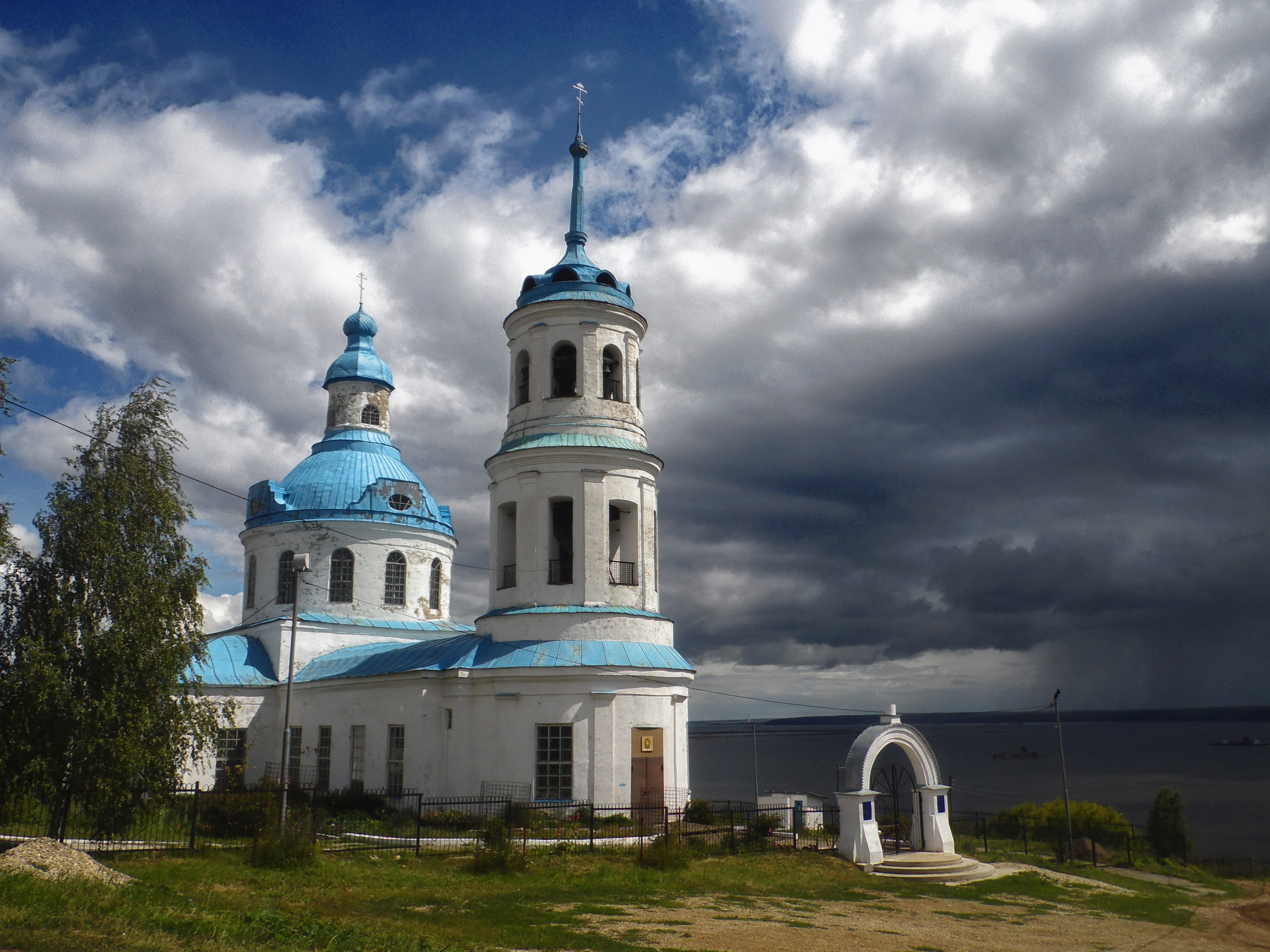
Epiphany Church in the Quiet Mountains

=== Background ===
The first settlements on the territory of the modern Mendeleevsky district date back to the 17th–18th centuries. The main settlements were the village of Tikhie Gory, the village of Bondyuga and the village of Kamashevo. These villages were at one point part of the Kurakovskaya Volost of the Yelabuzhsky Uyezd of the Vyatka Governorate.

Yegor Ushkov was a famous native of the village of Bondyuga. He opened a workshop for dyeing homemade canvas and yarn. Ushkov got rich quickly. His eldest son Yakov bought up the surrounding land using the Ushkov's savings. His grandson Kapiton Ushkov later opened a small plant for the production of Potassium dichromate in 1868. Over time, Kapiton's son Peter expanded production, building new workshops and introducing new technologies, making the company an important workplace in the region. In 1915, Lev Karpov who was the organizer of the chemical industry in the country arrived at the plant. Karpov helped to improve the work of the enterprise and organize the production of chloroform, hydrochloride, sulfur chloride, copper(II) sulfate, calcium chloride and liquid chlorine. The profit garnered by the plant was calculated in hundreds of millions of rubles. After 1917, the territory of the modern Mendleyevsky district was called the Bondyuzhsky district after the name of the industrial village.

The territory of the Bondyuzhsky district belonged to the Vyatka Governorate until 1921. The district was liquidated and the entirety of its territory was transferred to the Yelabuga district on 20 January 1935. The Bondyuzhsky district was later abolished and its territories became part of the Yelabuga district in 1963 as a result of the consolidation of administration in the TASSR. The urban-type settlement Bondyuga was transformed into a city and renamed into Mendeleevsk on 11 August 1967. The Mendeleevsky district was formed around the city of Mendeleevsk on 15 August 1985.

=== Contemporary Mendeleyevsky District ===
The district was headed by Rustam Gafarov from 2006 to 2010 until he was replaced by Tagir Harmatullin. Harmatullin left his post of his own free will in 2012 (in 2018 he was charged with abuse of office as head of the Mendeleevsky and Tukayevsky districts). After Harmatullin's tenure Igor Privalov was appointed head of the district and in 2015 he moved to another position. To date, the Mendeleevsky District is headed by Valery Chershintsev.

== Population ==
73.18% of the district's population are urban dwellers in the city of Mendeleevsk.

== Municipal-territorial structure ==
The Mendeleevsky municipal district has 1 urban and 14 rural settlements as well as 36 smaller settlements[9]. The administrative centers of these rural settlements are the villages Abalachi, Bizyaki, Bryushli, Yenaberdino, Ikskoye Uste, Izhevka, Kamayevo, Monashevo, Munayka, Pseevo, Staroye Grishkino, Tatar Chelny, Tikhonovo, Toyguzino, Turayevo and the city of Mendeleyevsk.

== Economy ==
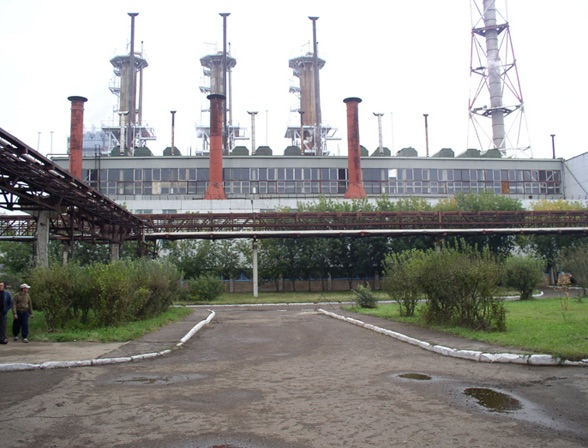
Chemical plant in Mendeleevsk

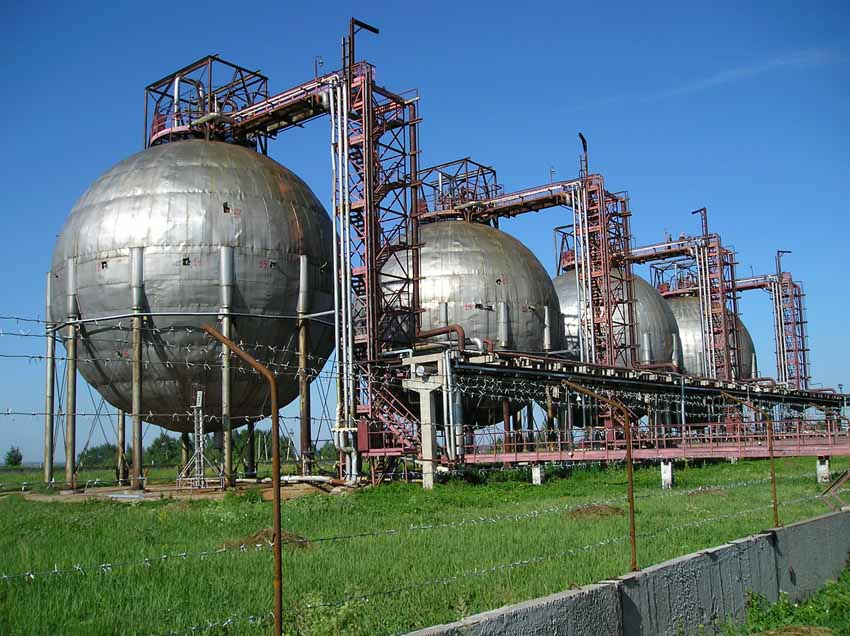
Nitrogen storage complex

=== Industry ===
The Mendeleevsky District is known for the production of basic chemical products, mineral fertilizers, oil and gas production. Significant reserves of raw materials and high-quality underground fresh and mineral water are concentrated in the district. Large enterprises "Prikamneft", "Kama Saks", "Spetsstroy" and others operate in Mendeleevsk.

The main enterprise of the region is the Chemical Plant Karpov, founded by the Ushkov family in 1868. The plant is engaged in the production and sale of chemical products, food additives and reagents, including pharmacopoeia. The enterprise was purchased by the Moscow company "GSM Chemical" in October 2019. In 2019 the plant's net margin amounted to 4.8 million rubles while its revenue was 828.2 million.

"Mende-Rossi" was one of the town-forming enterprises of the region in the 1990s. It was run by the brothers Gvidon and Ara Miribyan. The enterprise produced consumer goods and food products. The complex included a shoe factory, a sausage plant, a mini-bakery factory, and a furniture factory. The company's financial position became worse due to the owners' passion for gambling. In 1996 "Mende-Rossi" had a debt of more than 60 million rubles. The company was later liquidated in 2018.

The "Ammoni" plant was opened in the district in 2006. It was joined with "Mendeleevskazot" in 2014. The enterprise is engaged in the production of universal fertilizers. The enterprise was renovated in 2011–2016. Funds for the reconstruction were partially allocated by the state corporation "VEB.RF". The company signed a contract with Tokyo for the similar project "Ammoni-2" in 2016. Additionally, the plant received a subsidy from the federal budget in the amount of 153 million rubles yet the plant's own revenue in 2019 was only 2 billion rubles. The "VEB.RF" company planned to invest about 12 billion rubles in the "Ammoni" plant.

The value of goods produced in the region was valued at 14.3 billion rubles in January–September 2020.

=== Agriculture ===
The main crops grown in the Mendeleevsky region are rye, barley, oats, peas, and potatoes. There are state programs for local entrepreneurs designated "Support for novice farmers" and "Development local farms". With the assistance of these programs agricultural enterprises received over 32 thousand hectares of arable land. Four agricultural consumer co-operatives were created in the district in 2018. In the same year the gross output of the agricultural sector amounted to more than 1 billion rubles and the gross grain harvest was 33.8 thousand tons. In terms of the level of agricultural development in 2016, the district occupied the 42nd position in the republic. This ranking is largely related to the fact that agriculture is not the main economic activity of the district. The district is also among the outliers for milk production in the 2019. In the first half of 2020, the gross output of agriculture of the region amounted to 151 million rubles.

=== Investment potential ===
The region relies on the development of competitive industries that take advantage of the increasing complexity of agriculture and the strengths of the district. The project to create an industrial park "Ammoni Agro" was initiated in 2016 on site established 10 km from Mendeleevsk, next to the "Ammoni" plant. The production of fertilizer will become the basis of production at "Ammoni Agro". The park encompasses 50 hectares. The volume of investment in the facility amounted to 1.2 billion rubles for 2016. Among the entities at the park are "Grand-M Trade" (100 million in investment) and "GSM Chemical" (invested 200.9 million rubles). The opening of the park was scheduled for the spring of 2018 and the completion of the main stages of development is expected by 2020.

The management of the SEZ (the Special Economic Zone) "Alabuga" bought 487 hectares in the Mendeleevsky district for 1.1 billion rubles for the purpose of constructing its own industrial park in 2017. The proposed site is intended for new industries processing "Ammoni's" products.

TASED (the Territory of Advanced Social-Economic Development) was created on the territory of Mendeleevsk in 2019. It is the fifth and youngest territory in the republic for the development of small and medium-sized businesses in special economic conditions. The minimum requirements for residents is less than the regional one: investments of 2.5 million rubles and the creation of at least 10 jobs in the first year of work. There are six residents in Mendeleevsk in 2020. The city authorities announced that they are negotiating with three potential residents, whose combined investment total 450 million rubles.

The total volume of investment in the district (excluding budgetary funds) amounted to 377 million rubles from January–June 2020.

=== Transport ===
The total length of all highways in the region is 397.72 km. The main highways in the district are the M7 (Volga) "Yelabuga -Izhevsk – Perm" and "Naberezhnye Chelny – Mendeleevsk – Tersi – Agryz". There are four urban, four suburban and two intercity bus routes in the district. The main railway stations serving the district are "Mendeleevsk", "Toima" and "Tikhonovo".

== Ecology ==
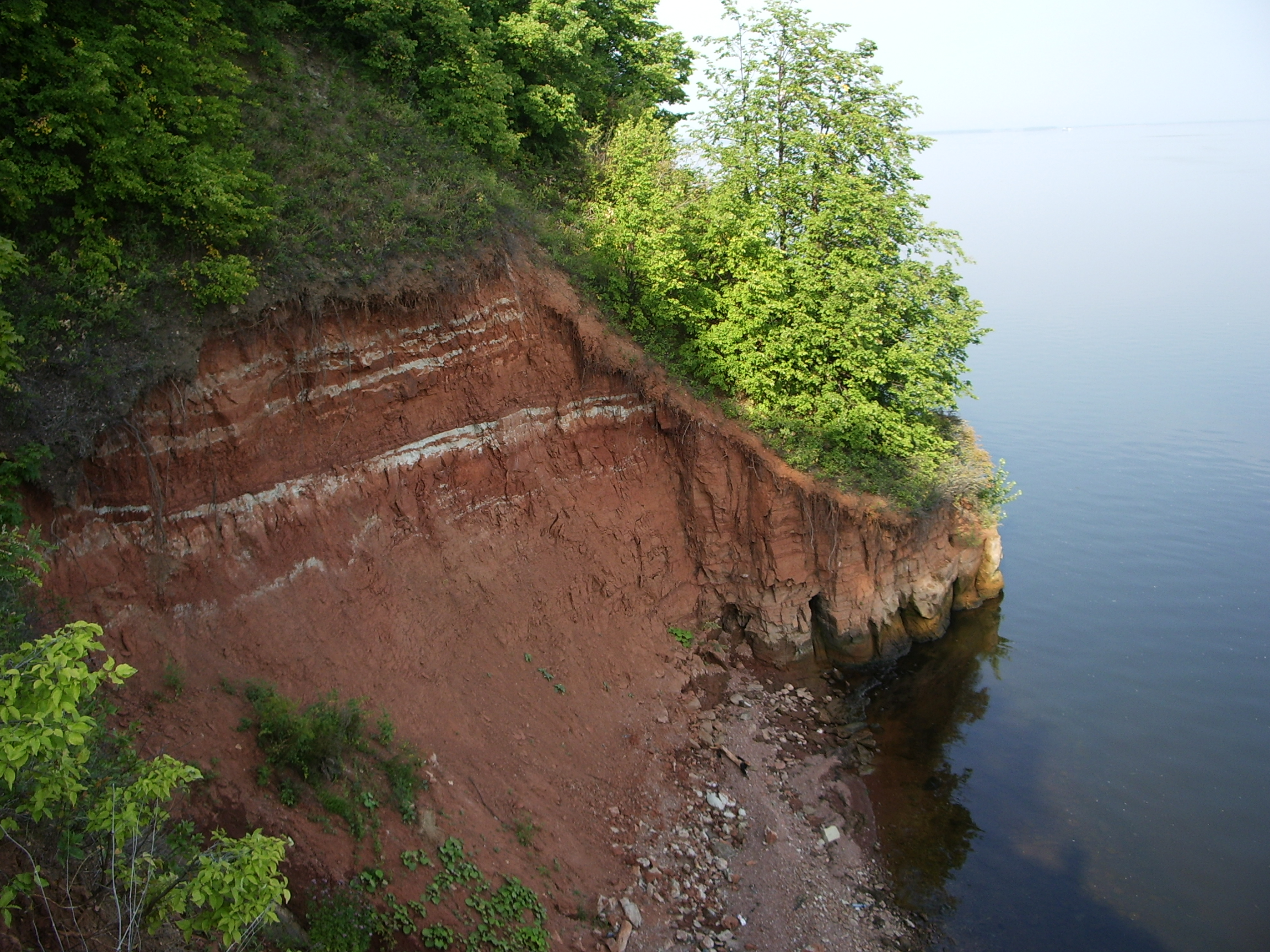
Clay cliff of the Kama river

A specially protected zone was created in Mendeleevsk in 1999. Its area is 5.1 hectares and includes a natural site on the banks of the Toyma River with the estate of the Ushkov breeders. Pine, fir, larch, linden, maple, poplar, mountain ash grow in the park [6]. The "Ammoni" plant works to reduce the negative impact on the environment. Thus, the enterprise refused to discharge wastewater into the Kama River. According to the environmentalists of the supervisory authorities, the maximum concentration of atmospheric pollutants from the plant does not exceed the permissible values even with the most unfavorable weather conditions.

== Society and Culture ==
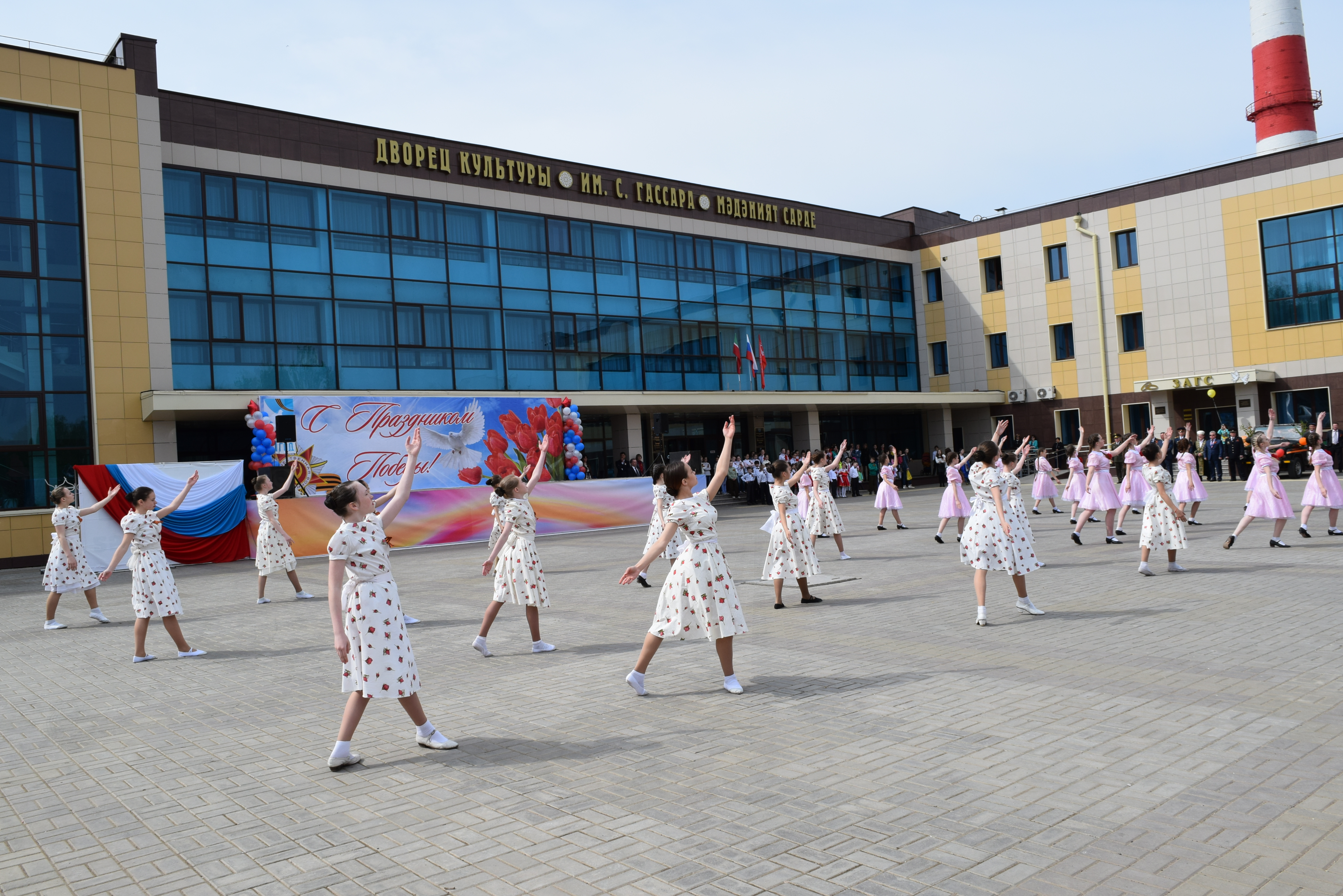
Celebrating Victory Day

There are 24 secondary schools, 21 preschool institutions, one vocational school, a children's art school, 22 libraries, the Palace of Culture and a local history museum in the Mendeleevsky district. There are also 109 sports facilities with clubs for 26 sports in the region. The Tatar language and literature is taught in all district schools. The largest medical institution in the region is the Central Hospital with an ambulance station and 22 obstetric hospital branches.

The share of income from tourism and recreational services is less than 1% of the budget of the Mendeleevsky municipal district. There are 14 objects of cultural heritage of Tatarstan in the region. One of them is the Church of the Epiphany in the village of Tikhie Gory, which was built in 1818. The average annual number of visitors to regional ethnographic museums is only 550 persons. Two large excursion routes were created in the region – "Mendeleevsk: history and modernity" and "Mendeleevsk is the city of military glory" in 2016.
