= Nolinsky =

Nolinsky (masculine), Nolinskaya (feminine), or Nolinskoye (neuter) may refer to:

- Nolinsky District, a district of Kirov Oblast, Russia
- Nolinsky Uyezd (1780–1929), an administrative division (an uyezd) of Vyatka Viceroyalty and Vyatka Governorate of the Russian Empire and the early Russian SFSR
- Nolinskoye Urban Settlement, a municipal formation which the Town of Nolinsk in Nolinsky District of Kirov Oblast, Russia is incorporated as
