= Tirsä =

Tirsä Тирсә
- selo
- Location within Tatarstan
- Country: Russia
- Region: Tatarstan
- District: Ägerce District

Population (2015)
  - Total: 1,781
- Time zone: UTC+3:00

Tirsä (Tatar: Тирсә, romanized: Tirsä) is a rural locality (a selo) in Ägerce District, Tatarstan. The population was 1765 as of 2010. Tirsä is located 25 km from Ägerce, district's administrative centre, and 295 km from Ԛazan, republic's capital, by road. The village already existed during the period of the Qazan Khanate. There are 17 streets in the village.
