= Ushkova House =

Building in Kazan, Tatarstan, Russia

Coordinates: 55.7917°N 49.1209°E

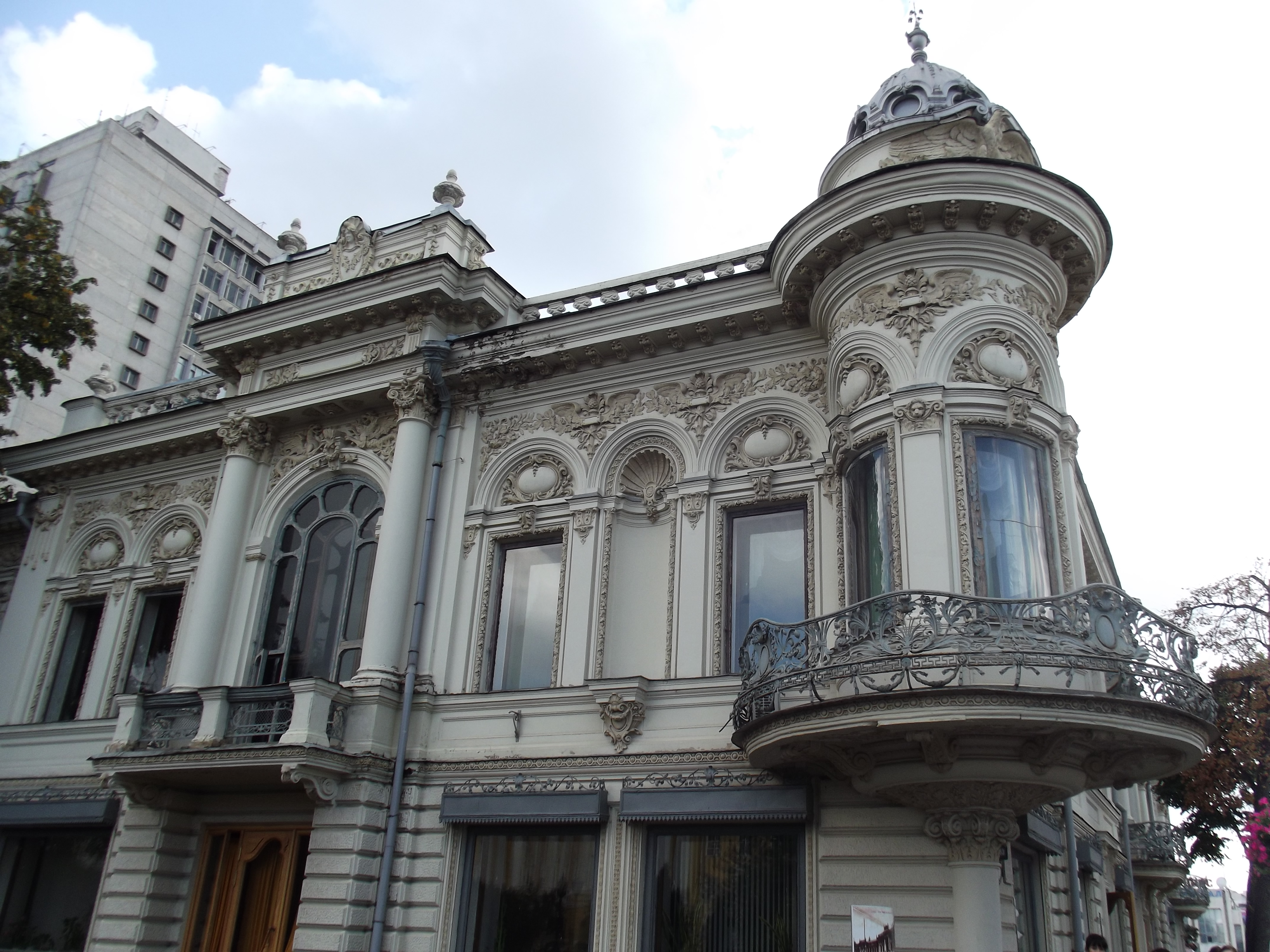
Ushkova House in Kazan

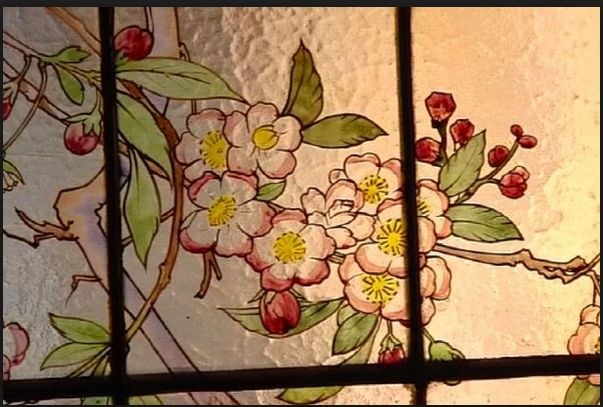
Original stained-glass window

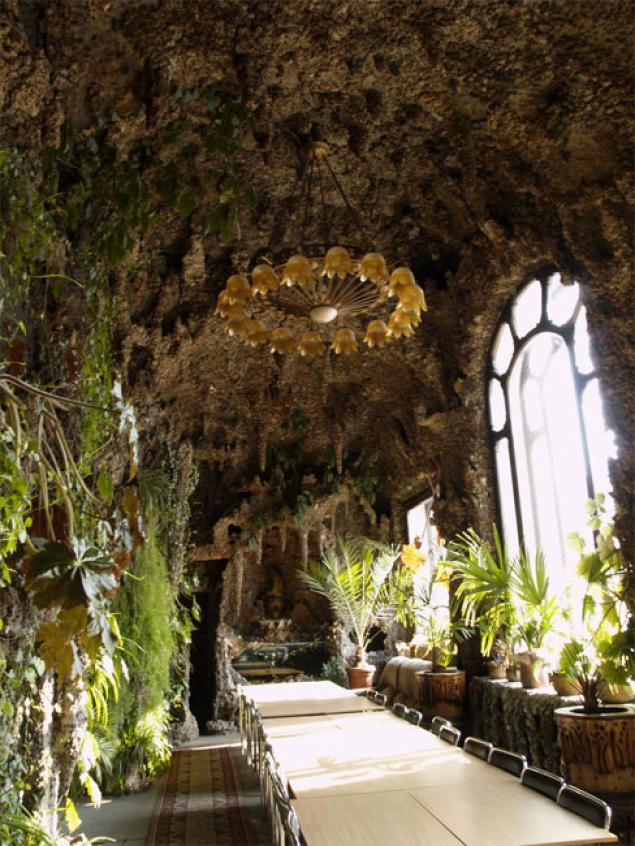
Grotto or winter garder located on the second floor

The House of Zinaida Ushkova is a building in Kazan, in the Republic of Tatarstan, Russia, which was reconstructed in the beginning of the 20th century in an eclectic style. It is an impressive sight in the city center and an object of Russian heritage. In 1919 it became a central building of the National Library of the Republic of Tatarstan and is now open to visitors and tourists.

== History ==
While studying at Kazan State University, Alexey Ushkov (1879-1948) - one of the sons of wealthy industrialist Konstantin K. Ushkov and grandson of the chemical plant owner Kapiton Ushkov - married Zinaida Nikolaevna Vysotskaya. As a wedding gift for his wife, he bought existing buildings on Voskresenskaya street and ordered their redesign and reconstruction by Karl Mufke, the architect-builder of the Kazan Art School and Kazan University. At the same time he ordered another mansion from Mufke in Moscow. Both were done in a mixed style with Empire and Baroque influences.

The House of Ushkova was reconstructed from 1904 to 1908 (or according to other sources, 1903-1907). Karl Mufke himself led the reconstruction of the Kazan buildings. The architect was reportedly so engrossed in his work that he even sometimes neglected his own safety; the Kazan Telegraph reported in 1906 that he fell from scaffolding and broke two ribs, but got up and continued his work.

After the October Revolution, property of Ushkov family was expropriated. In 1919, The House of Ushkova became a central building of National Library of the Republic of Tatarstan - one of the biggest libraries of Volga region. The original layout, design and interior finishings are still well preserved.

== Interesting facts ==
Zinaida and Alexey broke up after three years of marriage. Alexey got married second time to Alexandra Balashova, prima ballerina of Bolshoi Theater.
