= Nizhnyaya Toyma =

Nizhnyaya Toyma may refer to:

- Nizhnyaya Toyma (rural locality), a village in Kirov Oblast, Russia
- Nizhnyaya Toyma (river), a tributary of the Northern Dvina in Russia
