= Iq Tamağı =

Ikskoye Uste Ык Тамагы Iq Tamağı
- selo
- Location within Tatarstan
- Country: Russia
- Region: Tatarstan
- District: Mendeleyevsky District
- Municipality: Bäzäkä rural settlement
- Time zone: UTC+3:00

Ikskoye Uste (Russian: Икское Устье, Tatar: Ык Тамагы, romanized: Iq Tamağı) is a rural locality (a selo) in Mendeleyevsky District, Tatarstan. The population was 65 as of 2010. Ikskoye Uste is located 20 km from Мendeleyevsk, district's administrative centre, and 253 km from Kаzаn, republic's capital, by road. The village was established in 17th century. There are 12 streets in the village.
