= Nizhnyaya Toyma (rural locality) =

Nizhnyaya Toyma Нижняя Тойма
- Village
- Interactive map of Nizhnyaya Toyma
- Location of Nizhnyaya Toyma Nizhnyaya Toyma (Kirov Oblast)
- Coordinates: 56°14′N 50°59′E
- Country: Russia
- Federal subject: Kirov Oblast
- Administrative district: Vyatskopolyansky District
- Rural OkrugSelsoviet: Srednetoymensky
- Elevation: 131 m (430 ft)

Population
  - Estimate (2010): 1,105 )

Municipal status
  - Municipal district: Vyatskopolyansky Municipal District
  - Rural settlement: Srednetoymenskoye Rural Settlement
- Time zone: UTC+3 (MSK)
- Postal code: 612975
- OKTMO ID: 33610420111

Nizhnyaya Toyma (Russian: Нижняя Тойма) is a rural locality (a village) in Vyatskopolyansky District of Kirov Oblast, Russia.

In 1913, the village belonged to Malmyzhsky Uyezd of Vyatka Governorate, Russian Empire.
