= Asaf Abdrakhmanov =

Soviet Union naval officer

- Born: 20 December 1918; Agryz, RSFSR
- Died: 3 September 2000 (aged 81); Sevastopol, Ukraine
- Military career
- Allegiance: Soviet Union
- Branch: Soviet Navy
- Service years: 1939–1973
- Rank: Captain 1st Rank
- Conflicts: World War II
- Awards: Hero of the Soviet Union

Asaf Kutdusovich Abdrakhmanov (Russian: Аса́ф Кутду́сович Абдрахма́нов Tatar: Асаф Котдус улы Габдерахманов, romanized: Asaf Kotdus uly Gabderakhmanov ; 20 December 1918 — 3 September 2000) was a Soviet naval officer awarded the title Hero of the Soviet Union during World War II.

== Early life ==
Abdrakhmanov was born on 20 December 1918 in Agryz to a Volga Tatar family. He grew up in a village in Agryzsky District and after graduating from junior high school and the Aviation Technical School in Kazan, Abdrakhmanov worked as a technician at an aircraft factory.

== Military career ==
Abdrakhmanov joined the Soviet Navy in 1939 and in 1942 he graduated from the Higher Naval College. After finishing training, Lieutenant Abdrakhmanov joined the Black Sea Fleet and served aboard Motor boats. He was in charge of a detachment of three Motor torpedo boats when the Soviet Navy raided Mariupol one night.

In November 1943, during the Kerch–Eltigen Operation, Abdrakhmanov landed the first assault troops onto the Crimean side of the Kerch Strait and delivered ammunition and troops. On 22 January 1944 he was awarded the title Hero of the Soviet Union for his courage and heroism in the fight against the Nazi invaders.

== Later life ==
From 1964 to 1973, Abdrakhmanov was the commander of a "monitoring ship" (Russian: Корабль измерительного комплекса, Korabl izmeritelnogo kompleksa)) named Suchan, one of the Soviet Navy's signals monitoring vessels involved with missile testing. (The ship was later renamed Spassk in 1972 as a side effect of the Sino-Soviet border conflict). He retired from his naval duties in 1973 and lived in Sevastopol for the remainder of his life, where he died on 3 September 2000. Currently there is a memorial plaque outside the house he lived in Sevastopol.

== Awards ==
- Hero of the Soviet Union
- Order of Lenin
- Two Order of the Red Banner
- Order of the Patriotic War 1st and 2nd classes
- Three Order of the Red Star
