= Ivan Susloparov =

Soviet general

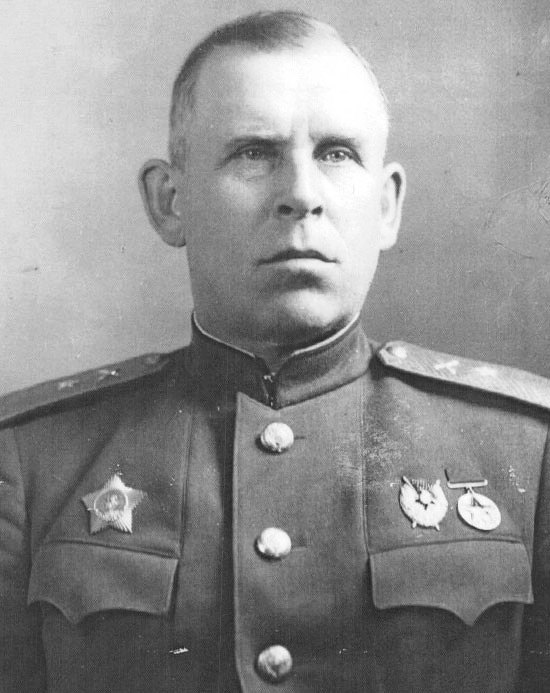
- Born: 19 October 1897; Krutikhintsy, Vyatka Governorate, Russian Empire
- Died: 16 December 1974 (aged 77); Moscow, Soviet Union
- Burial place: Vvedenskoye Cemetery
- Military career
- Allegiance: Russian Empire; Soviet Union
- Branch: Imperial Russian Army; Soviet Army
- Service years: 1917–1955
- Rank: Major General
- Conflicts: First World War; Russian Civil War; Second World War
- Awards: Order of Lenin; Order of the Red Banner (3); Order of Suvorov; Order of the Red Star; Medal "For Courage"

Ivan Alexeyevich Susloparov (Russian: Иван Алексеевич Суслопа́ров, also Sousloparov; 19 October 1897 – 16 December 1974) was a Soviet general who served in World War II as the Military Liaison Mission Commander with the French government and the Allied Expeditionary Force in Europe in 1944–45. He is mostly known as the person who signed for the Soviet Union the German Instrument of Surrender on 7 May 1945. He signed before receiving authorization from Moscow to do so; the Soviet Union insisted on signing another Act of Military Surrender near Berlin two days later.

== Biography ==
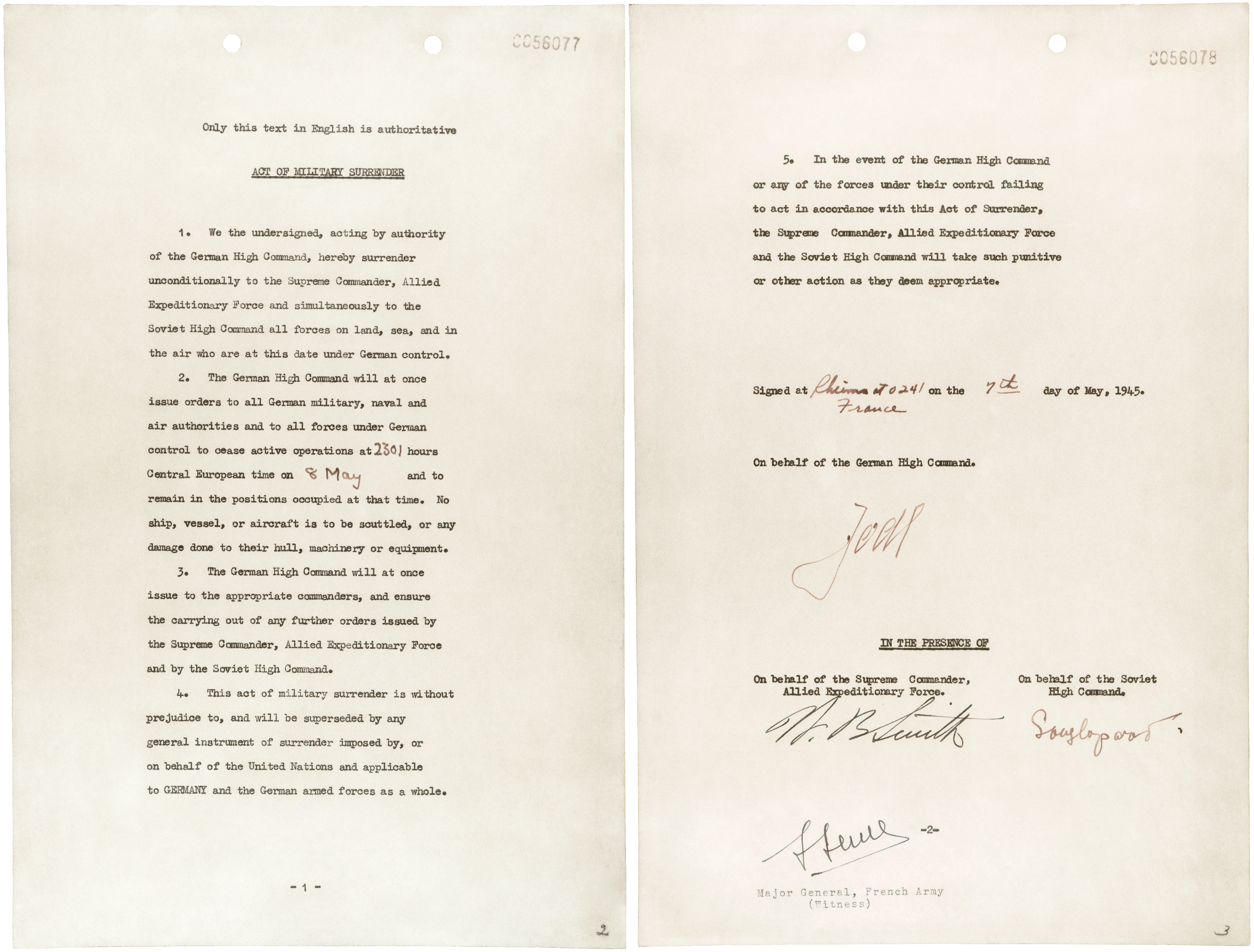
The Instrument of Surrender with Susloparov's signature at the bottom: 7 May 1945

Ivan Susloparov was born in the village of Krutikhintsy, in what is today Kumyonsky District of Kirov Oblast in northeastern European Russia. He fought in the First World War as a non-commissioned officer, participated in the October Revolution of 1917, and fought in the Red Army on the Eastern and Southern Fronts of the Russian Civil War. After the Reds' victory, Susloparov stayed in the army. While in service, he graduated from Kiev's Joint Military School in 1925, and from Engineering Command Department of Dzerzhinsky Military Academy in 1938.

In 1939, Susloparov was appointed as the Soviet military attaché in Paris, where, it is said, he also was in charge of the Soviet military intelligence network in Western Europe, including the so-called Rote Kapelle organization.

When General Officer ranks were introduced in the Red Army, Susloparov was made Major General; the commission was reported in the Red Star on 12 July 1940.

After the invasion of the Soviet Union by Germany in 1941, Susloparov served in the headquarters of the Red Army's artillery; from 1942 until the middle of 1944 he was the commander of the artillery of the 10th Army of the Western Front.

In the summer of 1944 Susloparov was posted to recently liberated Paris again, as the chief of the Soviet liaison mission with the French Government and the Supreme Headquarters Allied Expeditionary Force. His moment of fame came on 7 May 1945, when Dwight D. Eisenhower informed him of the arrival of German general Alfred Jodl with the proposal of Germany's surrender. Although initially planning to surrender only to the Western Allies, the German emissary had to agree to surrender the rump Nazi forces to all allies. At Eisenhower's suggestion, Susloparov forwarded the proposed text of the surrender instrument to his superiors in Moscow, and started to wait for the authorization to sign it in the name of the USSR. No response, however, came by the scheduled signing ceremony time (02:30 on 8 May), and General Susloparov made the decision to sign the document, but with the caveat that a new surrender ceremony would take place elsewhere if any of the allies requested it. Susloparov executed the document using the French transliteration of his name, Sousloparov, rather than Cyrillic letters.

As Susloparov went to report on his actions to Moscow, he saw a freshly arrived order not to sign the surrender document.

Just as Susloparov expected, the Soviet Government indeed requested a second surrender ceremony, which took place in Karlshorst near Berlin late on 8 May. General Susloparov was present there as well.

After the war, General Susloparov worked in the Military Diplomatic Academy in Moscow, an institution that trained military attachés and intelligence officers. His job title was described as nachalnik kursa, i.e. the officer in charge of all cadets who entered the academy in a particular year. He died on 16 December 1974 in Moscow, and was buried in Vvedenskoye Cemetery.
