= Chemical Plant Karpov =

Russian chemical plant in Tatarstan

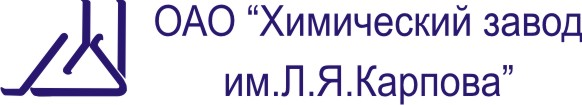

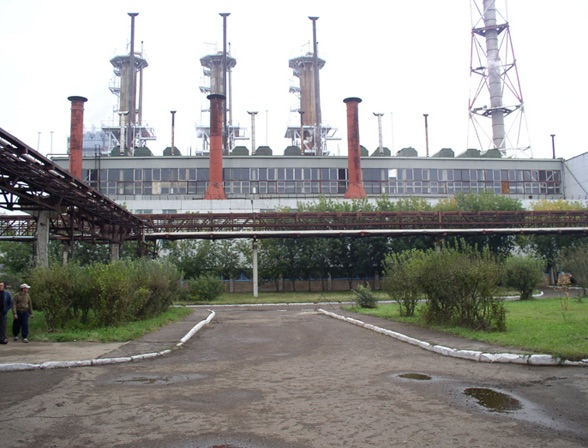
- Native name: Химический завод имени Л. Я. Карпова
- Industry: Chemical
- Founded: 1868 in Mendeleyevsk, Russia
- Founder: Kapiton Ushkov
- Headquarters: Mendeleyevsk, Russia
- Key people: Lev Karpov
- Website: www.karpovchem.ru

Chemical Plant Karpov is a Russian chemical plant in Mendeleyevsk, Tatarstan. JSC Chemical Plant Karpov is a joint stock company which runs the oldest chemical plant in Russia. The company was named after Lev Karpov.

== History ==
The plant was founded by Kapiton Ushkov. It was founded in 1868.

== Owners and management ==
The Chemical Plant is owned by two companies: Jiesem Chemical LLC (DSMK, 51%) and En-Him LLC.

Member of the Board of Directors (from 2018) - Timur Metshin.

CEO — Shamsin Damir Rafisovich.

Deputy General Directors — Valery Chershintsev and Rinat Sabirov.
