= Abalaç =

Abalaç Абалач
- selo
- Location within Tatarstan
- Country: Russia
- Region: Tatarstan
- District: Mindälä District
- Municipality: Abalaç rural settlement

Population (2020)
  - Total: 277
- Time zone: UTC+3:00

Abalaç (Tatar: Абалач, romanized: Abalaç) is a rural locality (a selo) in Mindälä District, Tatarstan. The population was 307 as of 2010. Abalaç is located 18 km from Mindälä, district's administrative centre, and 223 km from Qazаn, republic's capital, by road. The village was established in 1781. There are 2 streets in the village.
