= Susloparov =

Susloparov (Russian: Суслопа́ров) is a Russian surname. In the early- and mid-20th century, it would be often transliterated as Sousloparov, due to the French-style transliteration convention used in Soviet passports.

Notable persons with surname Susloparov:

- Ivan Alekseyevich Susloparov (1897–1974), Red Army general
- Yuri Vladimirovich Susloparov (born 1958), Soviet soccer player
