= Turay, Tatarstan =

Turay Турай
- selo
- Location within Tatarstan
- Country: Russia
- Region: Tatarstan
- District: Mindälä District
- Time zone: UTC+3:00

Turay (Tatar: Турай, romanized: Turay) is a rural locality (a selo) in Mindälä District, Tatarstan. The population was 434 as of 2010. Turay is located 19 km from Mindälä, district's administrative centre, and 252 km from Qazаn, republic's capital, by road. The earliest known record of the settlement dates from 1664. There are 9 streets in the village.
