= Qamay =

Qamay Камай
- selo
- Location within Tatarstan
- Country: Russia
- Region: Tatarstan
- District: Mindälä District

Population (2017)
  - Total: 404
- Time zone: UTC+3:00

Qamay (Tatar: Камай, romanized: Qamay) is a rural locality (a selo) in Mindälä District, Tatarstan. The population was 414 as of 2010. Qamay is located 14 km from Мindälä, district's administrative centre, and 237 km from Qazаn, republic's capital, by road. The earliest known record of the settlement dates from 1678. There are 6 streets in the village.
