= Monay, Tatarstan =

Monay Монай
- derevnya
- Location within Tatarstan
- Country: Russia
- Region: Tatarstan
- District: Mindälä District

Population (2017)
  - Total: 516
- Time zone: UTC+3:00

Monay (Tatar: Монай, romanized: Monay) is a rural locality (a derevnya) in Mindälä District, Tatarstan. The population was 494 as of 2010. Monay, Tatarstan is located 5 km from Mindälä, district's administrative centre, and 224 km from Qazаn, republic's capital, by road. The earliest known record of the settlement dates from 1680. There are 10 streets in the village.
