= Yaransky Uyezd =

Yaransky Uyezd (Яранский уезд) was one of the subdivisions of the Vyatka Governorate of the Russian Empire. It was situated in the southwestern part of the governorate. Its administrative centre was Yaransk.

== Demographics ==
At the time of the Russian Empire Census of 1897, Yaransky Uyezd had a population of 366,773. Of these, 86.0% spoke Russian, 13.9% Mari and 0.1% Tatar as their native language.
