= İj-Bubıy =

İj-Bubıy Иж-Бубый
- selo
- Location within Tatarstan
- Country: Russia
- Region: Tatarstan
- District: Ägerce District
- Municipality: Agryzsky District

Population (2021)
  - Total: 693
- Time zone: UTC+3:00

İj-Bubıy (Tatar: Иж-Бубый, romanized: İj-Bubıy) is a rural locality (a selo) in Ägerce District, Tatarstan. The population was 710 as of 2010. İj-Bubıy is located 5 km from Ägercе, district's administrative centre, and 314 km from Ԛаzan, republic's capital, by road. The village was established in 1640. There are 14 streets in the village.
