= Urzhumsky Uyezd =

Urzhumsky Uyezd (Уржумский уезд) was one of the subdivisions of the Vyatka Governorate of the Russian Empire. It was situated in the southern part of the governorate. Its administrative centre was Urzhum.

== Demographics ==
At the time of the Russian Empire Census of 1897, Urzhumsky Uyezd had a population of 289,188. Of these, 69.5% spoke Russian, 25.5% Mari, 4.8% Tatar, 0.3% Udmurt and 0.1% Romani as their native language.
