= Bäzäkä =

Bäzäkä Бәзәкә
- derevnya
- Location within Tatarstan
- Country: Russia
- Region: Tatarstan
- District: Mindälä District
- Municipality: Bäzäkä rural settlement

Population (2002)
  - Total: 725
- Time zone: UTC+3:00

Bäzäkä (Tatar: Бәзәкә, romanized: Bäzäkä) is a rural locality (a derevnya) in Mindälä District, Tatarstan. The population was 706 as of 2010. Bäzäkä is located 12 km from Мindälä, district's administrative centre, and 242 km from Qazаn, republic's capital, by road. The village was established in 18th century. There are 10 streets in the village.
