= İj Tamağı =

İj Tamağı Иж Тамагы
- selo
- Location within Tatarstan
- Country: Russia
- Region: Tatarstan
- District: Mindälä District
- Municipality: İj Tamağı rural settlement

Population (2017)
  - Total: 982
- Time zone: UTC+3:00

İj Tamağı (Tatar: Иж Тамагы, romanized: İj Tamağı) is a rural locality (a selo) in Mindälä District, Tatarstan. The population was 940 as of 2010. İj Tamağı is located 23 km from Мindälä, district's administrative centre, and 255 km from Qаzаn, republic's capital, by road. The earliest known record of the settlement dates from 1681. There are 20 streets in the village.
