= Orlovsky Uyezd (Vyatka Governorate) =

Subdivision of Vyatka Governate, Russian Empire

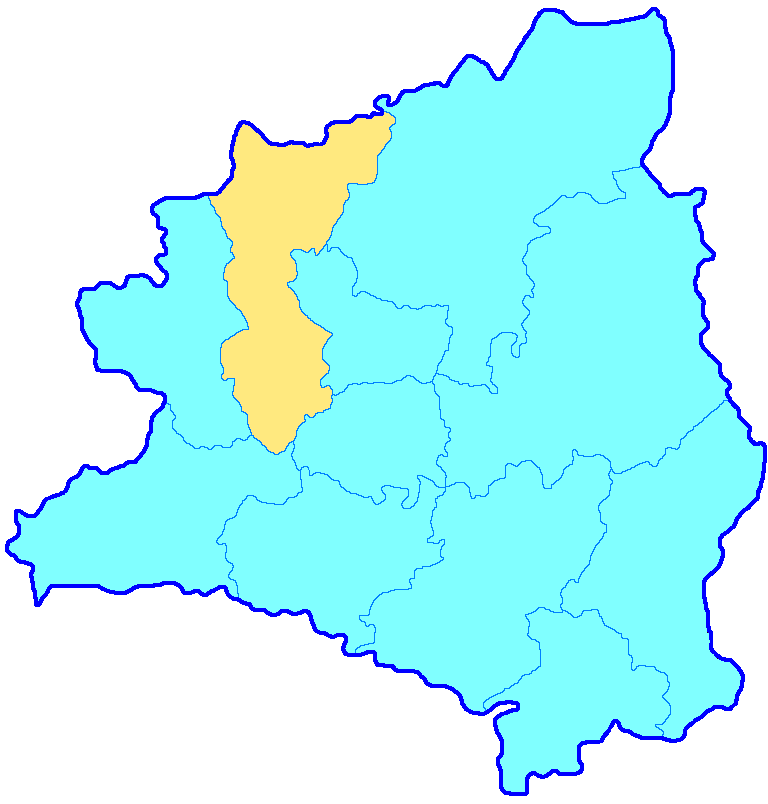

Orlovsky Uyezd (Орловский уезд) was one of the subdivisions of the Vyatka Governorate of the Russian Empire. It was situated in the northwestern part of the governorate. Its administrative centre was Orlov.

== Demographics ==
At the time of the Russian Empire Census of 1897, Orlovsky Uyezd had a population of 213,479. Of these, 97.6% spoke Russian and 2.4% Komi-Permyak as their native language.
