= Bigäş =

Staroye Grishkino Бигәш Bigäş
- selo
- Location within Tatarstan
- Country: Russia
- Region: Tatarstan
- District: Mendeleyevsky District
- Time zone: UTC+3:00

Staroye Grishkino (Russian: Старое Гришкино, Tatar: Бигәш, romanized: Bigäş) is a rural locality (a selo) in Mendeleyevsky District, Tatarstan. The population was 547 as of 2010. Staroye Grishkino is located 8 km from Mendeleyevsk, district's administrative centre, and 232 km from Kazan, republic's capital, by road. The earliest known record of the settlement dates from 1710. There are 8 streets in the village.
