= Pesäy =

Pesäy Песәй
- derevnya
- Location within Tatarstan
- Country: Russia
- Region: Tatarstan
- District: Mindälä District

Population (2010)
  - Total: 388
- Time zone: UTC+3:00

Pesäy (Tatar: Песәй, romanized: Pesäy) is a rural locality (a derevnya) in Mindälä District, Tatarstan. The population was 388 as of 2010. Pesäy is located 21 km from Mindälä, district's administrative centre, and 252 km from Qazаn, republic's capital, by road. The earliest known record of the settlement dates from 18th century. There are 9 streets in the village.
