= Alfiya Kogogina =

Russian politician

- Альфия Когогина
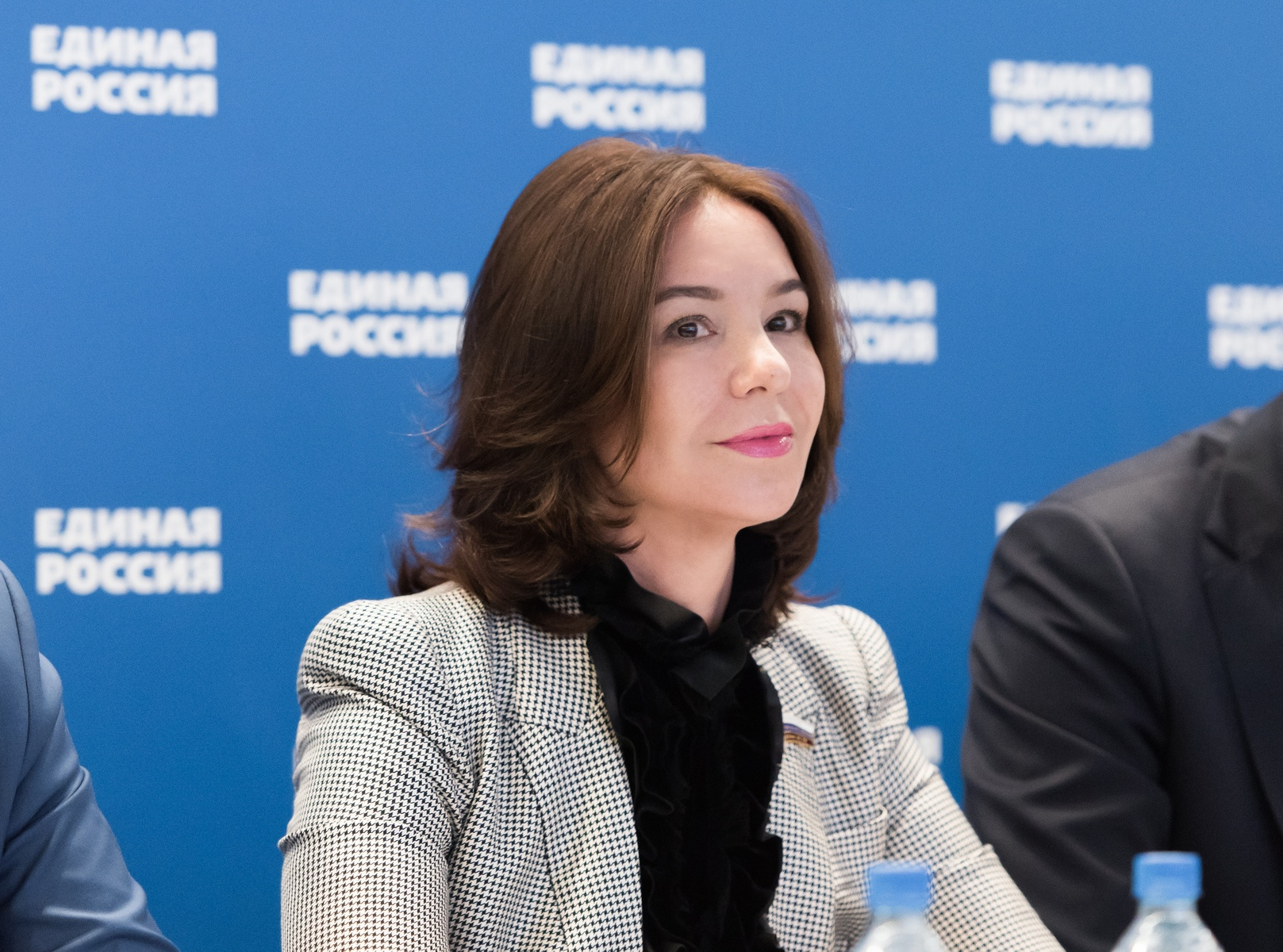

Member of the State Duma for Tatarstan
- Incumbent
- Assumed office 5 October 2016
- Preceded by: Constituency re-established
- Constituency: Naberezhnye Chelny (No. 29)

Member of the State Duma (Party List Seat)
- In office 21 December 2011 – 5 October 2016

Personal details
- Born: 22 February 1968 (age 58) Zelenodolsk, Tatar ASSR, Russian SFSR, USSR
- Party: United Russia
- Spouse: Sergey Kogogin
- Education: Kazan Federal University

Alfiya Gumarovna Kogogina (née Garifullina, Russian: Альфия Гумаровна Когогина, born 26 February 1969 in Zelenodolsk, Republic of Tatarstan) is a Russian political figure and deputy of the 6th, 7th, and 8th State Dumas.

From 1992 to 1999, she was the chief specialist and the head of the Department of Economics, Financial Analysis and Forecasting, head of the Department of Marketing and Investment Policy in the Administration of the Zelenodolsk District and the City of Zelenodolsk. On 23 December 2002 she was appointed the director of sales and leasing development at the Kamaz. In 2011, she was elected deputy of the 6th State Duma from the Tatarstan constituency. In 2016 and 2021, she was re-elected deputy of the 7th and 8th State Dumas respectively.

== Sanctions ==
Due to the violation of Ukraine’s territorial integrity and independence during the Russo-Ukrainian war, she is subject to personal international sanctions imposed by various countries.

On February 23, 2022, she was included in the European Union sanctions list for actions and policies that undermine the territorial integrity, sovereignty, and independence of Ukraine and further destabilize the country.

On February 24, 2022, she was added to Canada’s sanctions list of “close associates of the regime” for voting to recognize the independence of the so-called republics in Donetsk and Luhansk.

On March 24, 2022, amid Russia’s invasion of Ukraine, she was placed on the United States sanctions list for “complicity in Putin’s war” and “supporting the Kremlin’s efforts to invade Ukraine”. The U.S. Department of State stated that members of the State Duma use their authority to persecute dissenters and political opponents, suppress freedom of information, and restrict the human rights and fundamental freedoms of Russian citizens.

On similar grounds, she has been under Swiss sanctions since February 25, 2022; under Australian sanctions since February 26, 2022; under UK sanctions since March 15, 2022; and under Ukrainian sanctions by presidential decree of Volodymyr Zelenskyy since September 7, 2022. She has also been under New Zealand sanctions since October 12, 2022.

== Awards ==
- Commendation from the Government of the Russian Federation (August 20, 2015) — for achievements in legislative work and many years of diligent service.
- Medal “25 Years of the CIS Interparliamentary Assembly” (March 27, 2017, Interparliamentary Assembly of the CIS) — for contributions to the development and strengthening of parliamentarism, for advancing and improving the legal foundations of the Commonwealth of Independent States, and for fostering international relations and interparliamentary cooperation.
