= Lev Karpov =

- Лев Ка́рпов
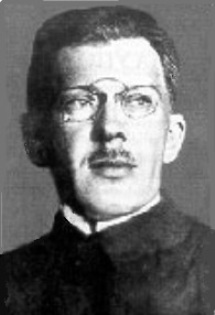
- Born: 18 April 1879; Kiev, Russian Empire
- Died: 6 January 1921 (aged 41); Moscow, Russian SFSR
- Resting place: Kremlin Wall Necropolis, Moscow
- Occupation: Chemist
- Political party: Bolshevik
- Spouse: Anna Luvishchuk

Lev Iakovlevich Karpov (Russian: Лев Я́ковлевич Ка́рпов; 30 April [O.S. 18 April] 1879 – 6 January 1921) was a Russian chemist, Bolshevik revolutionary and one of the main organisers of the chemical industry in Soviet Russia. He was a member of the League of Struggle for the Liberation of the Working Class and later joined the Russian Social Democratic Labour Party in 1898.

== Biography ==
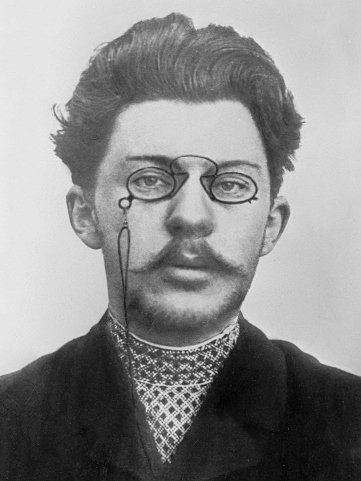
Karpov in 1912

Lev Karpov was the son of a bankrupt sales clerk. In 1898 he joined the Union of Struggle for the Emancipation of the Working Class and later the Russian Social Democratic Labour Party. He studied chemistry at the Moscow Higher Technical School graduating in 1910. After moving to Voronezh he became involved with the Northern Russian Workers’ Union. In 1915 he was appointed director of Bondjuschski Sawod in Mendeleyevsk (Tatarstan), the oldest chemical factory in Russia, established in 1868, which was later renamed the Chemical Plant Karpov after him.

After the October Revolution, he became the head of the department of the chemical industry of the RSFSR and founded the Central Chemical Laboratory (now Karpow-Institute for Physical Chemistry) in Moscow in 1918 and was appointed several high-ranking positions in the soviet administration such as becoming a member of the Supreme Council of the National Economy of the RSFSR.

Lev Karpov died on January 6, 1921, in Moscow, and is buried in Mass Grave No. 6 of the Kremlin Wall Necropolis in Red Square, Moscow.

Leonid Krasin spoke at his funeral suggesting that science would be able to restore the dead back to life:

I am certain that the time will come when science will become all- powerful, that it will be able to recreate a deceased organism. I am certain that the time will come when one will be able to use the elements of a person's life to recreate the physical person. And I am certain that when that time will come, when the liberation of mankind, using all the might of science and technology, the strength and capacity of which we cannot now imagine, will be able to resurrect great historical figures- and I am certain that when that time will come, among the great figures will be our comrade, Lev Iakovlevich.
