= Malmyzhsky Uyezd =

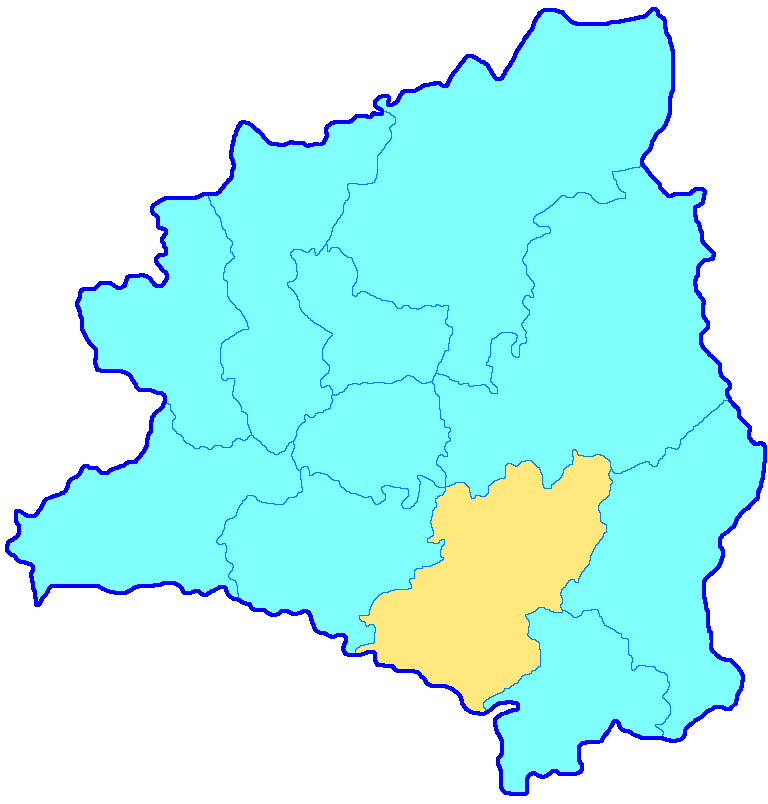
A map of the region.

Malmyzhsky Uyezd (Малмыжский уезд) was one of the subdivisions of the Vyatka Governorate of the Russian Empire. It was situated in the southern part of the governorate. Its administrative centre was Malmyzh.

== Demographics ==
At the time of the Russian Empire Census of 1897, Malmyzhsky Uyezd had a population of 280,427. Of these, 53.8% spoke Russian, 23.8% Udmurt, 18.6% Tatar and 3.7% Mari as their native language.
