= Nolinsky Uyezd =

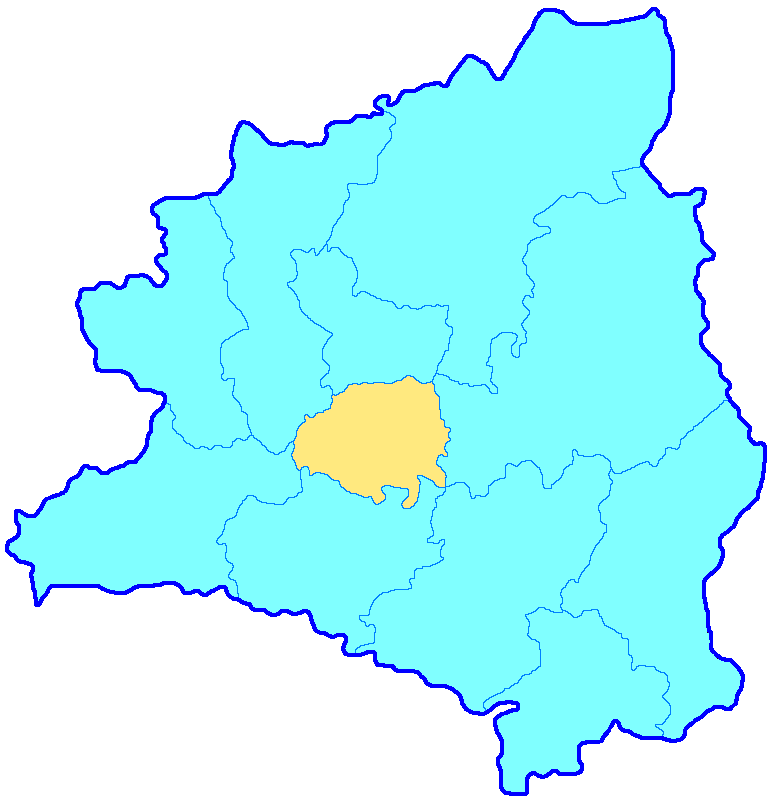
Nolinsky Uyzed on the map of Vyatka Governorate

Nolinsky Uyezd (Нолинский уезд) was one of the subdivisions of the Vyatka Governorate of the Russian Empire. It was situated in the central part of the governorate. Its administrative centre was Nolinsk.

== Demographics ==
At the time of the Russian Empire Census of 1897, Nolinsky Uyezd had a population of 180,707. Of these, 99.9% spoke Russian and 0.1% Tatar as their native language.
