= National Library of the Republic of Tatarstan =

National library of Tatarstan

Coordinates: 55.7918°N 49.1208°E

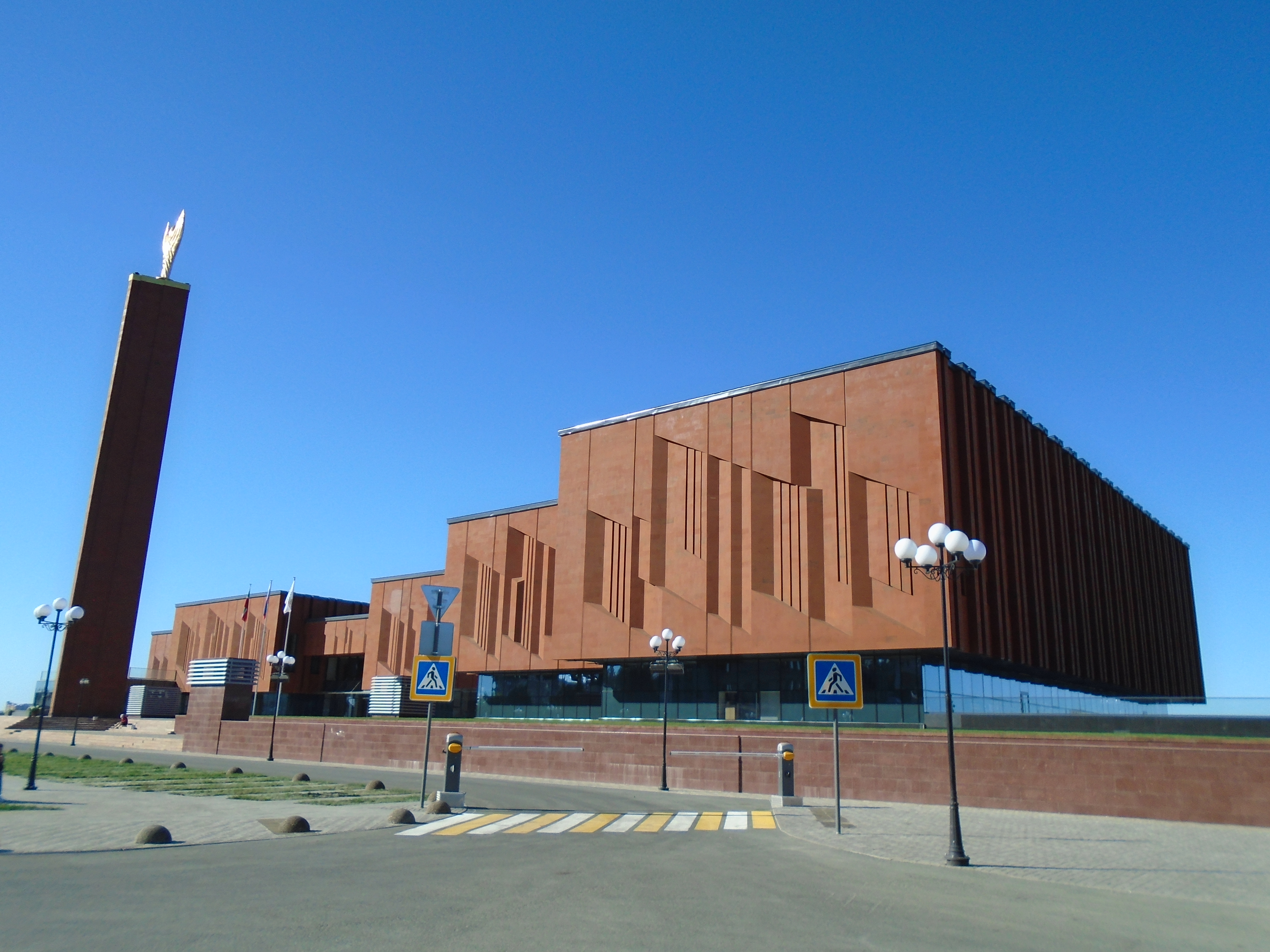
New building of the Kazan National Library.

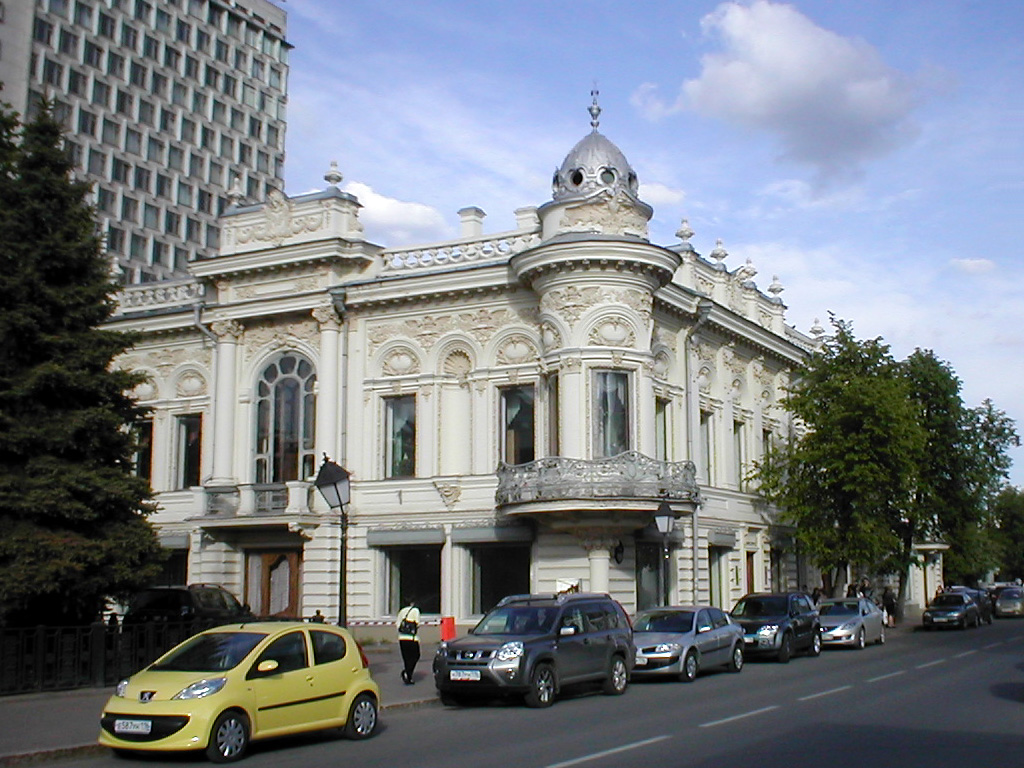
Old building of the library.

The National Library of the Republic of Tatarstan (Tatar: Татарстан Республикасы Милли китапханәсе, romanized: Tatarstan Respublikası Milli kitapxanäse) is the main state book depository in Tatarstan for national, republican, Russian and foreign publications. The library is located in Kazan, the capital of Tatarstan.

== See also ==
- List of libraries in Russia
