= Konstantin K. Ushkov =

Russian industrialist, philanthropist and patron of the arts

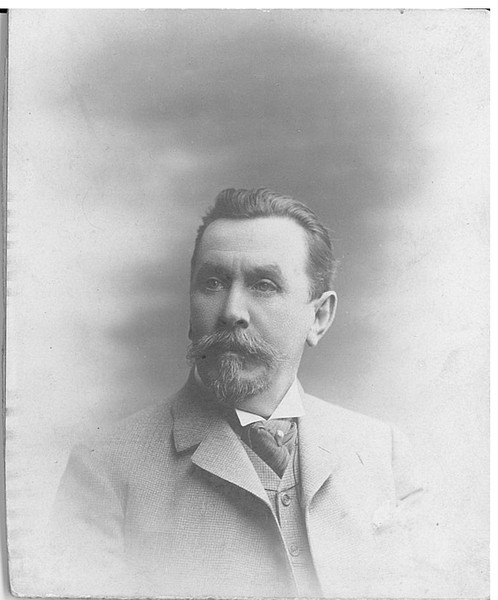
Konstantin K. Ushkov

Konstantin Kapitonov Ushkov (1850–1918) was a Russian industrialist in Tatarstan. He was a prominent philanthropist and patron of the arts.

Kontantin was the son of Kapiton Ushkov who had developed the chemical plant in Mendeleyevsk.

Konstantin was married to Maria Grigorievna Kuznetsov, who was the granddaughter of tea industralist Alexei Semyonovich Gubkin. He was father of Alexey Ushkov.
