= Vyatsky Uyezd =

Subdivision of the Vyatka Governorate of the Russian Empire

Vyatsky Uyezd (Вятский уезд) was one of the subdivisions of the Vyatka Governorate of the Russian Empire. It was situated in the central part of the governorate. Its administrative centre was Vyatka (Kirov).

== Demographics ==
At the time of the Russian Empire Census of 1897, Vyatsky Uyezd had a population of 192,208. Of these, 99.5% spoke Russian, 0.1% Polish, 0.1% Tatar, 0.1% Yiddish and 0.1% Komi-Zyrian as their native language.
