= Yelabuzhsky Uyezd =

Yelabuzhsky Uyezd (Елабужский уезд) was one of the subdivisions of the Vyatka Governorate of the Russian Empire. It was situated in the southern part of the governorate. Its administrative centre was Yelabuga.

== Demographics ==
At the time of the Russian Empire Census of 1897, Yelabuzhsky Uyezd had a population of 241,005. Of these, 53.3% spoke Russian, 21.9% Udmurt, 18.0% Tatar, 3.7% Bashkir and 3.1% Mari as their native language.
