= Agryzsky District =

Agryzsky District Агрызский район (Russian)
- District

Other transcription(s)
  - Tatar: Әгерҗе районы
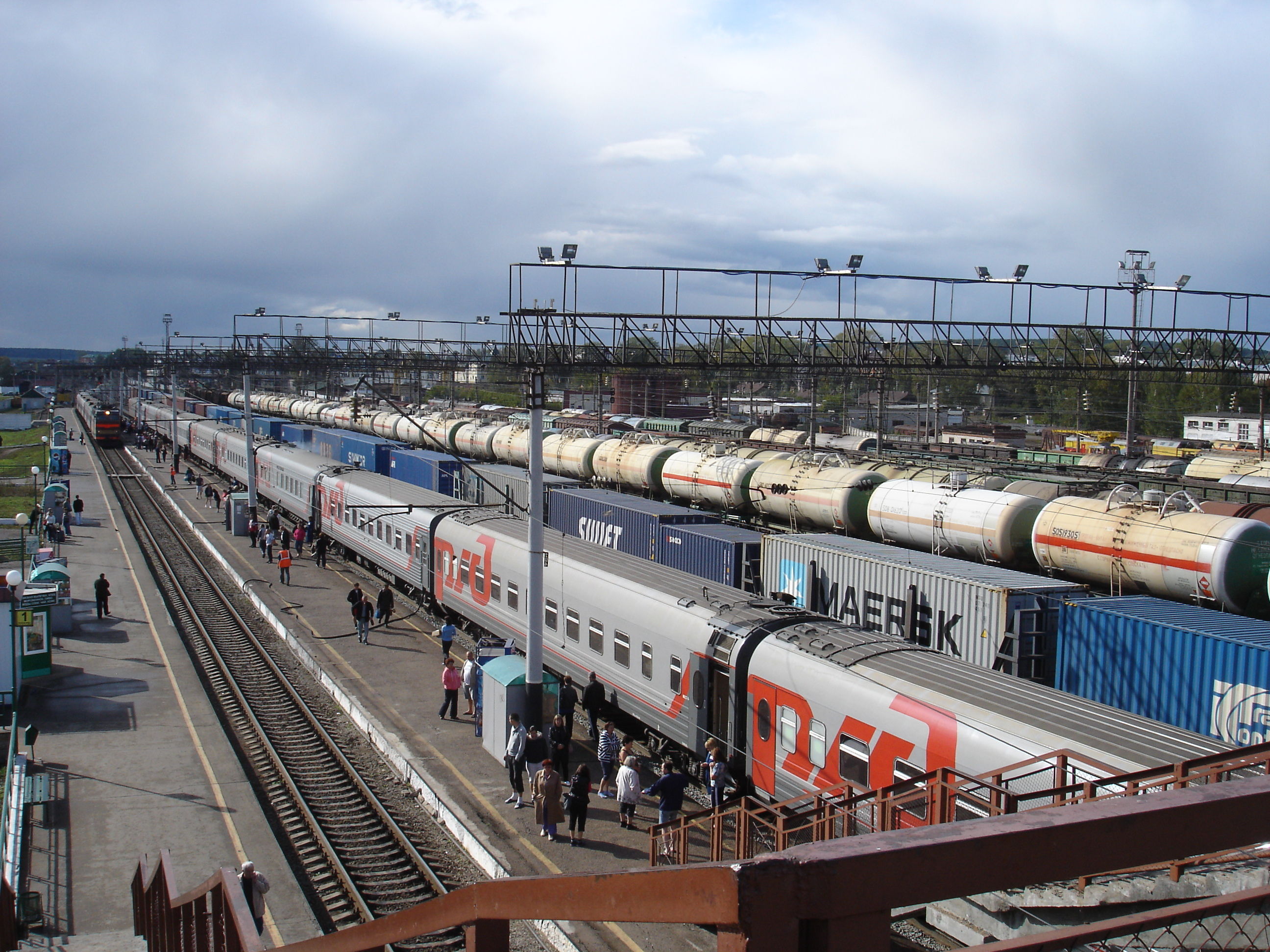
- Rail station in Agryz, Agrzsky District

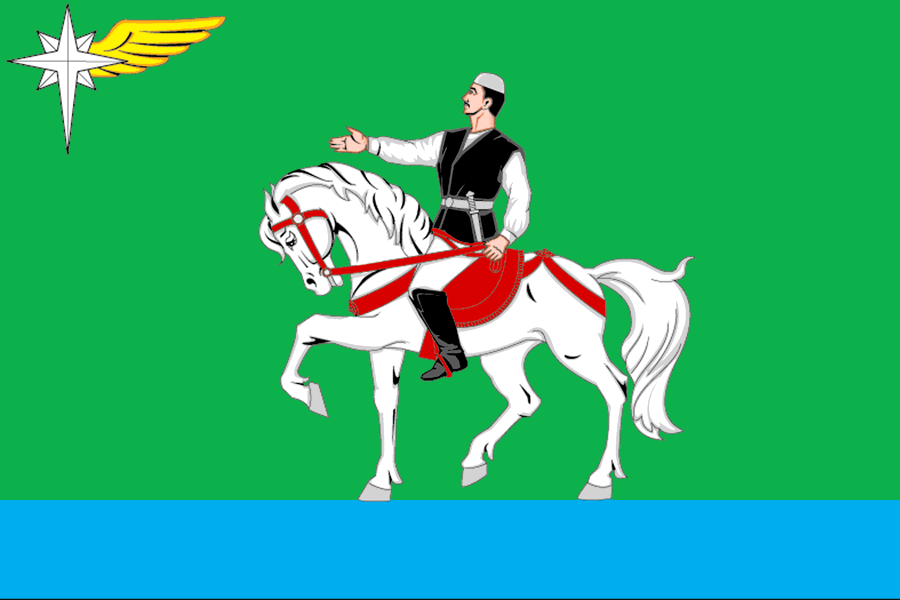
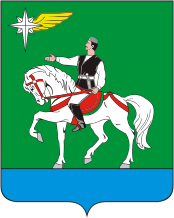
- Flag Coat of arms
- Location of Agryzsky District in the Republic of Tatarstan
- Coordinates: 56°07′N 53°08′E
- Country: Russia
- Federal subject: Republic of Tatarstan
- Established: 1924
- Administrative center: Agryz

Area
  - Total: 1,796.6 km^{2} (693.7 sq mi)

Population (2010 Census)
  - Total: 36,626
  - Density: 20.386/km^{2} (52.800/sq mi)
  - Urban: 52.7%
  - Rural: 47.3%

Administrative structure
  - Inhabited localities: 1 cities/towns, 71 rural localities

Municipal structure
  - Municipally incorporated as: Agryzsky Municipal District
  - Municipal divisions: 1 urban settlements, 21 rural settlements
- Time zone: UTC+3 (MSK)
- OKTMO ID: 92601000
- Website: http://agryz.tatarstan.ru/

Agryzsky District (Russian: Агрызский райо́н; Tatar: Әгерҗе районы) is a territorial administrative unit and municipality of the Republic of Tatarstan within the Russian Federation. The district is located in the northeast of the republic on the bank of the Izh River and occupies an area of 1,796.6 square kilometres (693.7 sq mi). According to the 2010 census, the municipality had a population of 36,848. The main city of Agryz accounts for 52.7% of the district's total population and is located 304 km east of Kazan and 36 km from Izhevsk.

The settlement of Agryz first appeared in historical records in 1646. After the suppression of Pugachev's uprising in 1775, Agryz became part of the Sarapulsky county (uyezd) within the Vyatka province. In 1914-1915, a railway connecting Kazan with the Urals was built near the Agryz settlement. Since the founding of the railway station, Agryz has become one of the largest railway hubs in the region. The Agryzsky district was first formed in 1924. In 1963, the district's territory was included in the Yelabuga agricultural region, but a year later Agryz would be restored within its former borders.

In September 2020, at a meeting of the Minister of Transport and Roads of Tatarstan, Agryz was selected as the site for a future international transport and logistics center. It is planned that the Agryz station will become a terminal for the export of goods to China and other countries. The project is being developed by the All-Russian Scientific Research Institute of Railway Transport.

== Geography and Climate ==
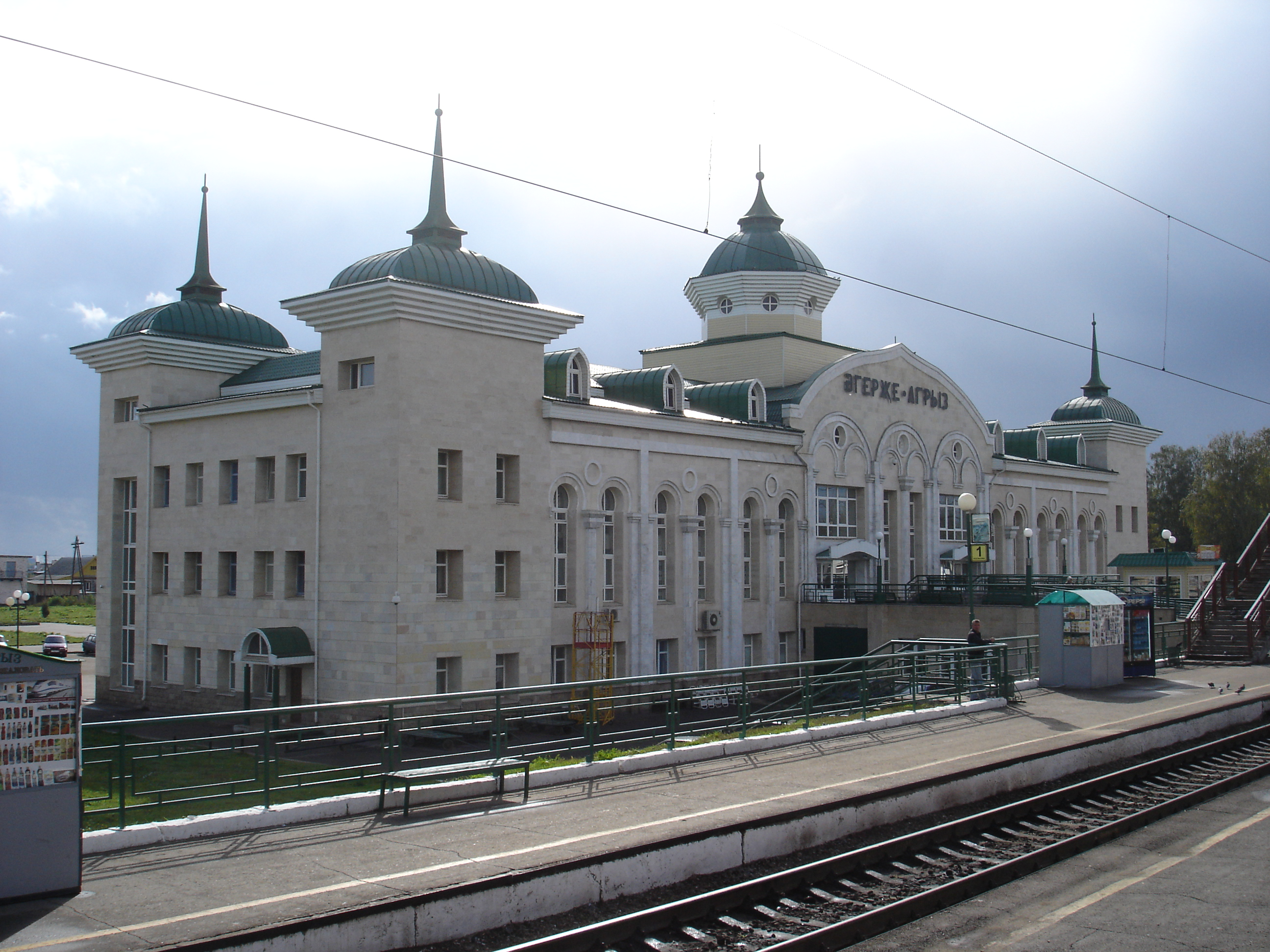
Agryz Train Station

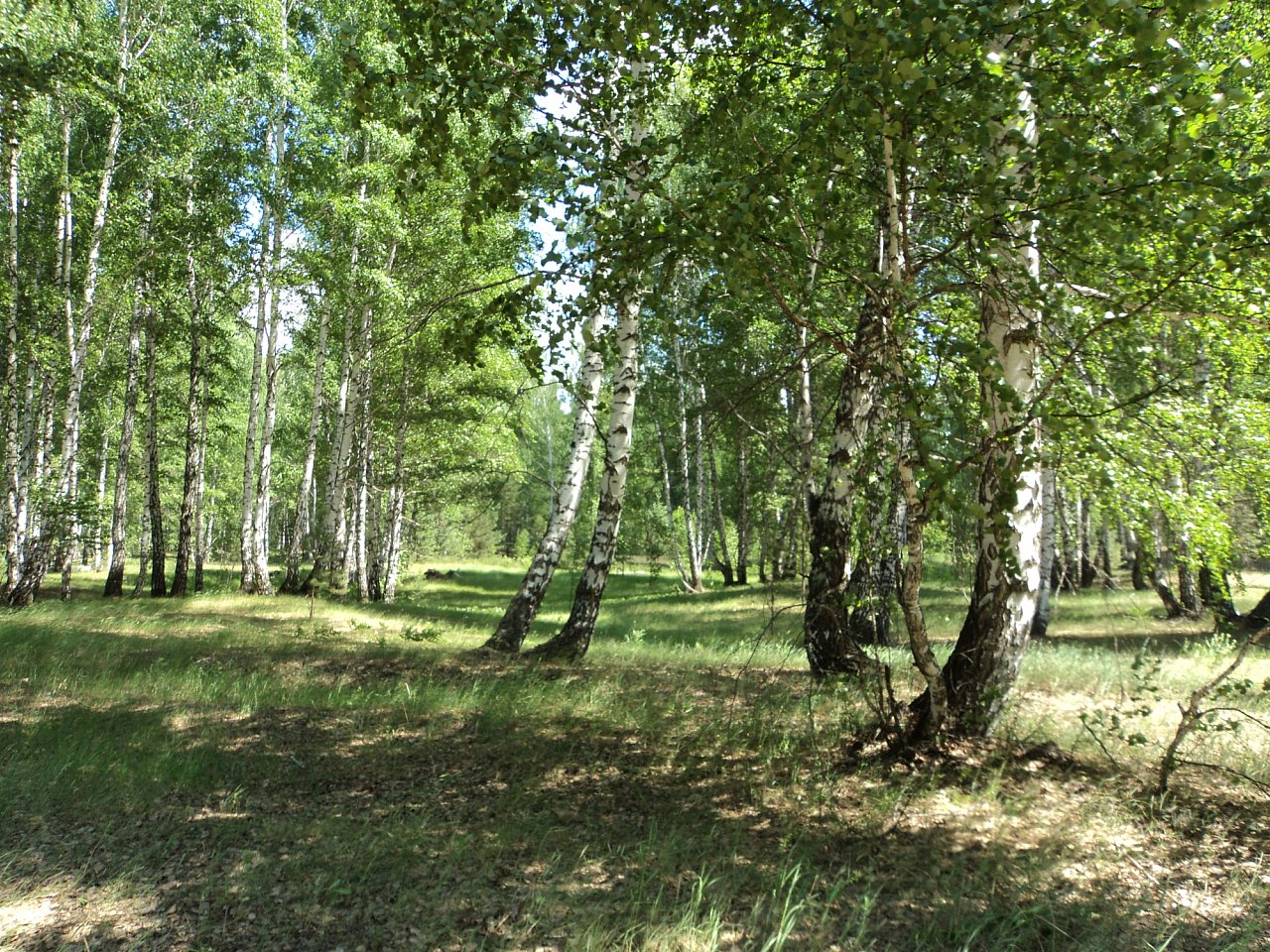
Kichke-Tan National Reserve

Agryz district is located in the north-east of the Republic of Tatarstan. It shares borders with the Udmurt Republic (Alnashsky district, Mozhginsky, Malopurginsky, Kiyasovsky, Sarapulsky, Karakulinsky districts) to the west, north and east; as well as with the Menzelinsky, Tukaevsky and Mendeleevsky districts of Tatarstan in the south along the watercourse of the Nizhnekamsky reservoir.

The area is located in the south of the Sarapulskaya Upland, in the valley of the Izh River. According to experts, the region has the wettest and coldest climate of all the Tatarstan regions with short, rainy summers and rainy springs. There are a number of nature reserves and wildlife sanctuaries in the district, including the large Kichke-Tan natural reserve and the Agryz state hunting reserve. One of the largest natural monuments in the region, "The floodplain of the Kyrykmas River", is located not far from the villages of Devyaterykh and Sosnovo. The natural park covers an area of more than a thousand hectares and consists of subtaiga forests and is a home to rare plants and animals. There are 29 species of fish in the Kyrykmas River and 75 species of birds inhabit its floodplains. The Agryz state hunting reserve with an area of more than 30 thousand hectares was organized in 1984 to restore the population of beavers and wood grouse. The reserve's forests are home to about ten species of animals, the hunting and trapping of which is limited. There are about 30 ancient archaeological sites on the Agryz territory, many of which date back to the early Iron Age. The following archaeological sites are protected by the state:

- Krasnoborsk graveyard
- Zyevsky graveyard
- Malinovskie Big and Small fortified settlements,
- The second Mynovsky ancient settlement.

According to a number of indexes, the ecological situation in the area is described as satisfactory. At the same time, in neighboring Udmurtia, the pollution emissions in 2015 amounted to 148 million tons.

== Flag and Coat of Arms ==
In August 2006, the Council of the Agryzsky municipal district approved its new heraldic insignia. The central figure of the coat of arms is represented by a rider on a white horse harnessed with a red bridle depicted on a green background. The figure is dressed in a white shirt, pants, a black sleeveless jacket and boots with a silver Tatar skullcap (kelapush) on his head. The rider personifies the legendary founder of the village, the warrior Agryz (Egerzhe), who points forward with his right hand as if predicting the future of the region. His figure is accompanied by a silver eight-pointed star with a wing — an allegorical depiction of the wind rose. The golden wing on the coat of arms is a symbol of the railway and Agryz station as a major railway junction. The blue bottom line of the coat of arms symbolizes the waters of the Nizhnekamsk reservoir, while the green field emphasizes the role of agriculture in the regional economy. The flag is based on heraldic elements of the coat of arms. In the flag, white represents clarity and reconciliation, red for courage, black for eternity and wisdom, green means health and nature, and blue honor and immortality. The flag has a width-to-length ratio of 2:3.

== Etymology ==
The district derives its name from the settlement of Agryz. According to a popular legend, which is reflected on the district's coat of arms, the toponym comes from the name of one of the mythical brothers Egerzhe (Tatar: Əgerce, Ägerce) who led the Tatar resettlement to this region after the conquest of Kazan. There is also a version that the toponym could derive its name from the local river.

== History ==
The small Tatar village of Agryz was first mentioned in historical sources from 1646 among the possessions of the Tatar noble family of Yaushevs. In 1774, Yemelyan Pugachev's rebellious army was stationed near the settlement. After the suppression of the uprising, Agryz became part of the Sarapulsky uyezd of the Vyatka province. In 1881, the local imam established the Agryz madrasah, where many prominent Tatar scholars and religious leaders studied and worked. Among them were the writers Daut Gubaidi and Najip Dumavi, the historian Jamal Validi, the archaeographer Zeynab Maksudova and others. In 1901, a Tatar women's school was founded in the village. By the beginning of the 20th century, there were 667 households in Agryz as well as a school and three mosques. The village experienced significant growth in 1914 when the Kazan-Yekaterinburg railway and the Agryz station were built.

During the anti-Bolshevik Izhevsk-Votkinsk uprising, Agryz fell under the control of the rebels and passed to Soviets only in the fall of 1918. In 1921, the Agryzsky canton was formed as part of the Tatar ASSR and Agryz received the status of a city. In 1921-1922, a severe famine broke out in the Volga region affecting the lives and killing several millions of people. During the period from January to March 1922, 738 people died of starvation and typhus in the Agryzsky canton. In June 1922, the city suffered a large fire that destroyed 134 courtyards, a mosque, baths and warehouses, or 18% of the total housing stock. Among other things, about 300 poods (roughly 5.5 tons) of bread were burned in the city. Historical reports do not report any casualties.

The Agryzsky canton repeatedly changed its borders and administrative affiliation. In 1924, the canton received the status of a district and was assigned to the Yelabuga executive committee. At its time of formation, the district included 25 village councils and 105 settlements with a population of more than 29 thousand people. In October 1960, almost the entire territory of the abolished Krasnoborsky district was transferred to Agryz. In February 1963, as a result of the republican administrative and territorial reforms, Agryz was included in the Yelabuga agricultural region, but by the following year it had already restored to its former borders.

== Agryzhan Tatars ==
The Agryzhan spelled out Agrizhan Tatar or Agryjan (Indian form), were the Muslim descendants of 51 Indian Hindu Punjabi Khatri Merchant and one Indian Muslim trader from North India mostly from Khatri caste, primarily from the Punjab, but also from Indian Merchants of Sindh and Rajasthan from the Marwari people, who settled in Astrakhan between 1636 and 1725, and called Astrakhan Indians this Men married with Buddhist Kalmyks, with local Muslim Tatar and Orthodox Christian Russian women. The families moved and lived then in the Agryz suburb and the descendants of these Indo-Turkic marriages were named after this suburb. The Agrizhan eventually assimilated with the Muslim Astrakhan Tatars.

== Administrative and Municipal Status ==
Currently, the district executive committee is subordinated to the Council, the head of the district and its residents. Since October 2020, the position of the head of the executive committee has been held by Artur E. Akbashev. The head of the region is Azat R. Valeev. In 2020 the Agryzsky district included one city and 72 settlements.

According to the results of the 2010 census, Tatars make up 58.1% of the region's population, 25.2% are Russians, 8% are Mari, 6.4% are Udmurts. As of 2018, the birth rate per thousand people was 8.5% and the death rate 13.8%. In 2019, both indexes dropped to 7.9% and 13.2%, respectively. Thus, the rate of natural population decline in 2019 was 5.3%.

== Economics ==
=== Contemporary Agryzsky District ===
Since the construction of a railway line and a marshalling yard in 1914-1915, the railway has been Argyz's core enterprise. Economists point out that about a third of the city's inhabitants work for the Russian Railways and the industry contributes about 50% of the tax revenue of the district budget. In 2020, Agryz was one of the 50 main marshalling yards in Russia. The station receives up to 10 thousand wagons per day and sorts about three thousand. The Agryz railway junction includes a repair and maintenance depot, a track machine station, communication centers and other departments. In September 2020, at a meeting of the Minister of Transport and Roads of Tatarstan, Agryz was selected as the future site for a new international transport and logistics center. According to the plan, the Agryz station will become a terminal for the export of goods to China and other destinations in Asia. The project is being developed under the auspices of the All-Russian Research Institute of Railway Transport.

Agriculture plays a leading role in the economy of the Agryz region and accounts for more than a quarter of the gross regional product. Agricultural lands cover about 100 thousand hectares, or more than 60% of the district's territory. Rye, barley, wheat, and potatoes are among the crops cultivated in the district. Among the most important industries are meat and dairy cattle breeding and beekeeping. The largest investors of the region include the companies Navruz and Agrofirma-Agryz (formerly Ak Bars-Agryz) which have invested in the construction and renovation of livestock farms and agricultural machinery. Other significant agricultural enterprises include Agryz-Agrokhimservis, Nazyar, S.-Omga, as well as individual farms. The main companies of the food and meat processing industry are the Agryz MK meat-packing plant, the Khlebopischekombinat and the "Bulgar" bakery plant. Additionally, the district specializes in the production of bread and grain procurements, met cattle, pork and dairy products. Economists state that the district has the potential to create an agro-industrial cluster that could unify farmers, processors and trade enterprises. Moreover, the region has large reserves of sand and clay, facilitating the operation of local construction and industrial organizations such as Stroygrad, Mirstroy and Stroygigant.

=== Investment Potential ===
In the period January–October 2020, the Agryzsky municipal district was ranked twenty-second in the republic in terms of socio-economic development. In 2019 the Agryzsky region attracted more than 5.3 billion rubles investment which is in excess of the 4 billion raised in the previous year. According to the Committee of the Republic of Tatarstan for Social and Economic Monitoring, the region's investment in fixed assets in the first half of 2020 amounted 4.2 billion rubles, or two percent of the total investment in the republic. The largest funds were allocated to machinery, equipment and state inventory. During the same time period, more than 11 thousand square meters of housing were commissioned in the Agryz district.

The 2015 the inauguration of the "Agryz-Razvitie" industrial site with a total area of twenty thousand square meters played a significant role in the development of the region's economy. Its main activity is the production of meat and meat products. With the commissioning of new workshops and areas, the plant's combined income in 2018 exceeded 1.3 billion rubles, while its share of tax payments to the district budget doubled. In 2019, another industrial site "Dobrolyubovo Village" with an area of 2.5 hectares was organized on the territory of the district. By its opening, two residents operated on the site, the producers of dairy products "Elis" and the mixed feed producer "Dobrolyubovo".

As a part of the republican project "Strategy 2030", the district's administration over the next decade will be focusing on creating a strong agro-industrial complex while reducing the natural rate of population decline in the region as well as increasing its average salary. The development of small and medium-sized businesses will be a special priority of this strategy. In 2018, the share of small businesses in the volume of gross territorial product was about 27%, while 42% of the total number of small and medium-sized businesses are engaged in the consumer market.

=== Transport ===
The city of Agryz serves as the regional center and a large railway junction connecting Udmurtia with Tatarstan and the Urals. The Agryz station is located at the intersection of Moscow—Kazan—Yekaterinburg, Agryz—Izhevsk as well as Agryz—Naberezhnye Chelny—Akbash railway lines.

The local road network is poorly developed, and the territory to the east of the Izh River is one of the most inaccessible and remote areas in the republic. The main regional road is Agryz—Kryndy—Mendeleyevsk. A small part of the M7 highway "Yelabuga—Izhevsk—Perm", running through Udmurtia has been laid near the districts' borders.

In the village of Krasny Bor, a wharf on the Kama was opened. In summers, there is a ferry crossing the Izh River between the villages of Salaushi and Blagodat'.

== Social Welfare and Public Life ==
In the Agryzsky district, medical care is provided by the Agryz central regional hospital whose departments include an outpatient hospital, an ambulance service, three outpatient clinics and 34 medical and obstetric stations.

In the 2018/2019 academic year 20 general education schools operated in the Agryzsky district with 4,010 students. Ten regional schools offer education in the Tatar language, four schools teach in Mari language and two more in Udmurt. There is also a children's art school, health centers, a sports school and other extracurricular activities.

The district's cultural resources are represented by 39 institutions and establishments including six museums. Since 1997, the Museum of History and Cultural Heritage of the Agryzsky region has operated in the district and displays more than 8 thousand exhibits. The district museum has branches including the museums of Tazi Gizzat and the local history museums in villages of Salaush, Tabarli and Izh-Bobya. Additionally, Agryz Central Library has 25 branches and owns a fund of more than 285 thousand copies of books and other printed materials.

There are 28 mosques and four churches in the district. Since 1931 the local newspaper "Әгерҗе хәбәрләре" ("Agryzskie Vesti") has been published in the region in Tatar and Russian.

The sports infrastructure of the region is represented by the Lokomotiv stadium, the Sputnik ice palace, schools and a number of other sports facilities.

== Cultural Heritage ==
Regional cultural heritage sites include:

- The 1905 house in the village of Izh-Bobya where the Tatar educators Nigmatullins—Bobinsky (Bubi) lived.
- A mosque in the village of Izh-Bobya was built in 1895 at the expense of the merchant M. Akhmetzhanov.
- The estate of the merchant M. Akhmetzhanov dating from the late 19th century
- The 1886 estate of the steward Arslangali Shaimardanov in the village of Izh-Bobya
- Tomb of Gabdulla Bubi (1871-1922) in the village Izh-Bobya.
- Peter and Paul Church in the village of Krynda was built in 1871.
- House of H. Sattarov in the village of Nizhnee Kuchukovo dating from the early 20th century.
- The mosque Saklovo in the village of Saklovo was built in 1906-1912.
- The building of the volost government of the early 20th century in the village of Isenbaevo.

Cultural heritage establishments:

- Water tower (Agryz, built in 1916, not used since 1962);
- Burial places of Soviet soldiers who died in the city of Agryz during World War II;
- Monument to Vladimir Azin (installed in 1967, Agryz);
- Mass grave of the Red Army (1967, Agryz);
- Building of the locomotive depot (1919, Agryz);
- Monument to a steam locomotive (installed in 2000, Agryz);
- Tomb of Kutdus Abdrakhmanov (1882-1962, village Izh-Bobya);
- The grave of the merchant M. Akhmetzhanov (1843-1925, the village of Izh-Bobya);
- Grave of the Tatar poet Daut Gubaidi (1873-1919, village Kadrali);
- House of merchants Gogolevs (two buildings of the late 19th - early 20th centuries in the village of Krasny Bor);
- Nikolskaya Church (1875, village Staraya Chekalda);
- Tomb of Hamit Rakhim (1899-1939, Tuba village).

== Bibliography ==
- Bazhenova, O. A. (2019). "Proekt programmy podderzhki MSP v Agryzskom raione Respubliki Tatarstan na 2019-2023 gg. [Draft program to support small and medium-sized businesses in the Agryz region of the Republic of Tatarstan for 2019-2023]" (PDF). Biznes. Obshchestvo. Vlast'. 1 (31): 127–144.
- Gallyamova, A. G. (2014). Istoriia Tatarstana i tatarskogo naroda, 1917-2013 gg.: Uchebnoe posobie [History of Tatarstan and the Tatar people, 1917-2013: A Textbook]. Kazan: Kazan Federal University.
- Faizullin, S. A. (2017). "Iz istorii goroda Agryza Tatarskoi ASSR: razrushitelnyi iiunskii pozhar 1922 goda [From the history of the city of Agryz within the Tatar ASSR: the devastating June fire of 1922]". Vestnik Viatskogo Gosudarstvennogo Universiteta (12): 43–45.
- Zigashin, I.I.; Ivanov, D.V.; Tomaeva, I.F. (2015). Ekologicheskii gid po zelenym ugolkam Respubliki Tatarstan [Ecological guide to the nature of the Republic of Tatarstan] (PDF). Kazan: Foliant. Archived from the original (PDF) on January 8, 2021.
