= Kapiton Ushkov =

Russian serf who became a major chemical industrialist in Tatarstan

Kapiton Yakovlevich Ushkov (Russian: Капитон Ушков; 1813–1868) was a Russian serf who became a major chemical industrialist in Tatarstan.

He was born in Bonduga, a village near Yelabuga, in Tatarstan. Bonduga was subsequently renamed Mendeleyevsk. Ushkov discovered that the raw materials for potassium bichromate, a chemical used in the dying process was to be found locally, and so he established a plant for its production in the village of Kokshan.

His family included Peter Ushkov (1840–1898) and Konstantin K. Ushkov (1850–1918).
