= Agryz =

Town in the Republic of Tatarstan, Russia

Agryz Агрыз
- Town

Other transcription(s)
  - Tatar: Әгерҗе
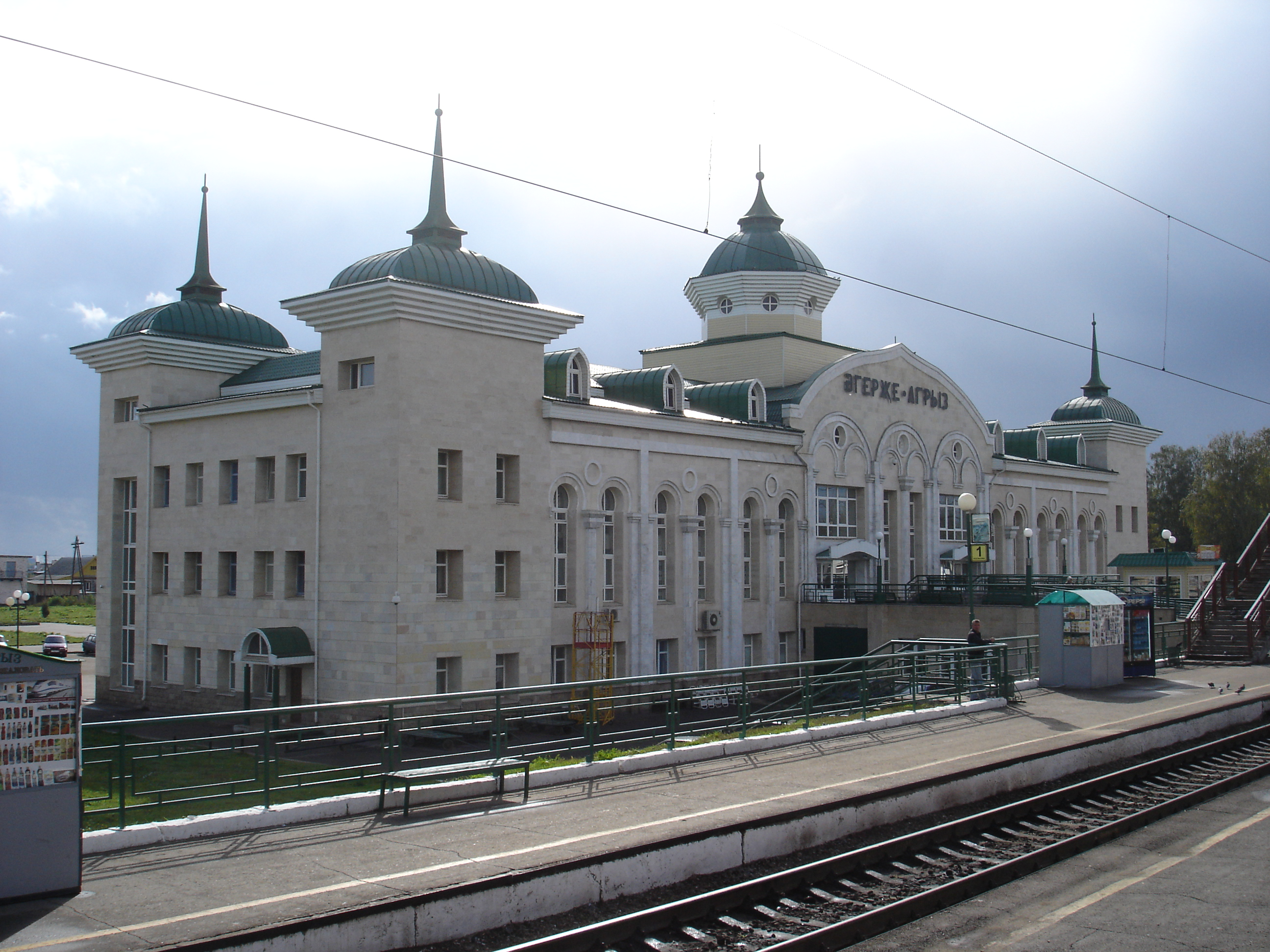
- Agryz railway station

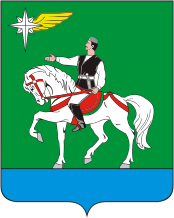
- Coat of arms
- Interactive map of Agryz
- Location of Agryz Agryz (Tatarstan)
- Coordinates: 56°31′19″N 52°59′51″E
- Country: Russia
- Federal subject: Tatarstan
- Administrative district: Agryzsky District
- Founded: 1915
- Town status since: August 28, 1938
- Elevation: 90 m (300 ft)

Population (2010 Census)
  - Total: 19,300
  - Estimate (2024): 19,804 (+2.6%)

Administrative status
  - Capital of: Agryzsky District

Municipal status
  - Municipal district: Agryzsky Municipal District
  - Urban settlement: Agryz Urban Settlement
  - Capital of: Agryzsky Municipal District, Agryz Urban Settlement
- Time zone: UTC+3 (MSK)
- Postal codes: 422230, 422231, 422233, 422239
- Dialing code: +7 85551
- OKTMO ID: 92601101001

Agryz population
- 2010 Census: 19,300
- 2002 Census: 18,620
- 1989 Census: 19,732
- 1979 Census: 20,137

Agryz (Russian: Агры́з; Tatar: Әгерҗе) is a town and the administrative center of Agryzsky District in the Republic of Tatarstan, Russia, located on the Izh River (Volga's basin), 304 kilometers (189 mi) east of Kazan. As of the 2010 Census, its population was 19,300.

== History ==
It was founded as a settlement serving the construction of the Kazan–Yekaterinburg railway. It was granted town status on August 28, 1938.

Agryz was one of the residence centers of the Udmurt Jews, who spoke the Udmurt idiom of Yiddish (Udmurtish).

== Agryzhan Tatars ==
The Agryzhan spelled out Agrizhan Tatar or Agryjan (Indian form), were the Muslim descendants of 51 Indian Hindu Punjabi Khatri Merchant and one Indian Muslim trader from North India mostly from Khatri caste, primarily from the Punjab, but also from Indian Merchants of Sindh and Rajasthan from the Marwari people, who settled in Astrakhan between 1636 and 1725, and called Astrakhan Indians this Men married with Buddhist Kalmyks, with local Muslim Tatar . The families moved and lived then in the Agryz suburb and the descendants of these Indo-Turkic marriages were named after this suburb. The Agrizhan eventually assimilated with the Muslim Astrakhan Tatars. They speak Tatar and Russian, using Tatar natively and Russian as a secondary language. They know about their Indian Heritage.

== Administrative and municipal status ==
Within the framework of administrative divisions, Agryz serves as the administrative center of Agryzsky District, to which it is directly subordinated. As a municipal division, the town of Agryz is incorporated within Agryzsky Municipal District as Agryz Urban Settlement.

== Notable people ==
- Asaf Abdrakhmanov (1918–2000), naval figure, Hero of the Soviet Union
- Maxim Groshev, professional hockey player with Tampa Bay Lightning
