= Vyatka Governorate =

1796–1929 unit of Russia

Coordinates: 58.6000°N 49.6500°E

Vyatka Governorate Вятская губерния
- Governorate of the Russian Empire (1796–1917), Russian Republic and RSFSR (1917–1929)
- 1796–1929
- Coat of arms

- Location within the Russian Empire
- Capital: Vyatka
- Area
  - (1897): 169,629 km^{2} (65,494 sq mi)
- Population
  - (1897): 3,030,831
- History
  - Established: 1796
  - Disestablished: 1929
- Political subdivisions: uezds: 11
Preceded by	Succeeded by
Vyatka Viceroyalty	Nizhny Novgorod Oblast

Vyatka Governorate (Note: Russian: Вятская губерния, romanized: Vyatskaya guberniya; Udmurt: Ватка губерний; Meadow Mari: Виче губерний; Tatar: Вәтке губернасы) was an administrative-territorial unit (guberniya) of the Russian Empire and the Russian SFSR from 1796 to 1929, with its capital in Vyatka (now Kirov). The area of the governorate roughly corresponds to modern-day Kirov Oblast and Udmurtia.

It was formed on territory of the historical lands of Vyatka (Latin: Veticiae).

== Geography ==
Vyatka Governorate bordered the Vologda Governorate (to the north), Perm Governorate (to the east), Nizhny Novgorod and Kazan governorates (to the south) and Kostroma Governorate (to the west). Its area was approximately 169,629 km^{2} (65,494 sq mi).

== Administrative divisions ==
The governorate was divided into 11 uyezds:

1. Vyatsky Uyezd
2. Glazovsky Uyezd
3. Yelabuzhsky Uyezd
4. Kotelnichsky Uyezd
5. Malmyzhsky Uyezd
6. Nolinsky Uyezd
7. Orlovsky Uyezd
8. Sarapulsky Uyezd
9. Slobodskoy Uyezd
10. Urzhumsky Uyezd
11. Yaransky Uyezd

== Population ==
According to the 1897 census, the population of the Vyatka Governorate was 3,030,831. Russian people comprised 77.4% of the population; Udmurt people – 12.5%; Mari people – 4.8%, and Tatar people – 4.1%. According to 1958 data the population was 2,123,904; according 1910 data it was 3,747,000.
