= Mendeleyevsk =

Town in the Republic of Tatarstan, Russia

Mendeleyevsk Менделеевск
- Town

Other transcription(s)
  - Tatar: Менделеевск
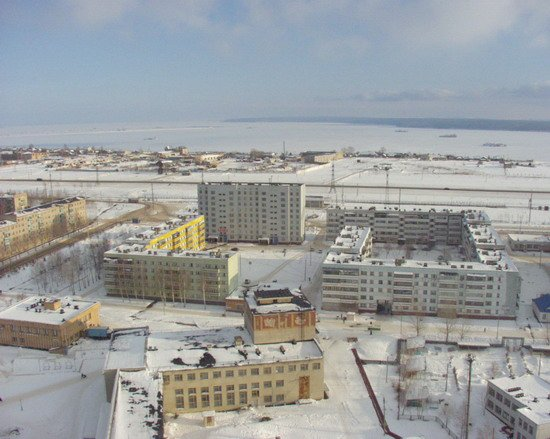
- View of Mendeleyevsk

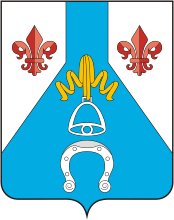
- Coat of arms
- Interactive map of Mendeleyevsk
- Location of Mendeleyevsk Mendeleyevsk (Tatarstan)
- Coordinates: 55°54′N 52°20′E
- Country: Russia
- Federal subject: Tatarstan
- Administrative district: Mendeleyevsky District
- Founded: 18th century
- Town status since: 1967

Area
  - Total: 14.1 km^{2} (5.4 sq mi)
- Elevation: 100 m (330 ft)

Population (2010 Census)
  - Total: 22,075
  - Estimate (2021): 22,875 (+3.6%)
  - Density: 1,570/km^{2} (4,050/sq mi)

Administrative status
  - Capital of: Mendeleyevsky District

Municipal status
  - Municipal district: Mendeleyevsky Municipal District
  - Urban settlement: Mendeleyevsk Urban Settlement
  - Capital of: Mendeleyevsky Municipal District, Mendeleyevsk Urban Settlement
- Time zone: UTC+3 (MSK)
- Postal code: 423650–423652
- Dialing code: +7 85549
- OKTMO ID: 92639101001

Mendeleyevsk (Russian: Менделе́евск; Tatar: Менделеевск) is a town and the administrative center of Mendeleyevsky District in the Republic of Tatarstan, Russia, located on the right bank of Nizhnekamskoye Reservoir, 238 kilometers (148 mi) from the republic's capital of Kazan. As of the 2010 Census, its population was 22,075.

== History ==
It was founded as the selo of Bondyuga (Бондюга) in the 18th century. It was granted urban-type settlement status and renamed Bondyuzhsky (Бондюжский) in 1928. In 1967, it was granted town status and given its present name after Dmitry Mendeleyev, who visited the factory there. The name comes because was Prof.Mendeleev who produced there the first batch of the smokeless Russian powder he developed at his Cankt Peterburg laboratory. The so-called "pyrocollodion". A single base powder similar to the British "cordite", the one still used in .303 British.

== Administrative and municipal status ==
Within the framework of administrative divisions, Mendeleyevsk serves as the administrative center of Mendeleyevsky District, to which it is directly subordinated. As a municipal division, the town of Mendeleyevsk is incorporated within Mendeleyevsky Municipal District as Mendeleyevsk Urban Settlement.

== Economy ==
As of 1997, industrial enterprises in the town included a chemical plant, a bakery, and a fertilizer factory.

Begishevo, the nearest airport, is located 50 kilometers (31 mi) south of Mendeleyevsk. The nearest railway station is Tikhonovo on the Agryz–Akbash line, 8 kilometers (5.0 mi) to the south.

== Demographics ==
Mendeleyevsk population
- 2010 Census: 22,075
- 2002 Census: 22,027
- 1989 Census: 18,085
- 1979 Census: 13,986

As of 1989, the population was ethnically mostly Tatar (48.5%), Russian (43.6%), Udmurt (2.4%), and Mari (2.1%).

== Notable people ==
- Kapiton Ushkov (1813–1868), a serf who became a major chemical industrialist
