= Izhevsk (disambiguation) =

Izhevsk is the capital city of the Udmurt Republic, Russia.

Izhevsk may also refer to:

- Izhevsk Airport, an airport in the Udmurt Republic, Russia
- Izhevsk Arsenal, better known as the Kalashnikov Concern
- Izhevsk Electromechanical Plant
- Izhevsk Mechanical Plant
- Izhevsk Radio Plant
- Izhevsk railway station
- Izhevsk Reservoir
- Izhevsk Urban Okrug, a municipal formation which the city of republic significance of Izhevsk in the Udmurt Republic, Russia is incorporated as
- FC Izhevsk, former association football club from Izhevsk, Russia, active in 1936–2005
- Lada Izhevsk, a subsidiary of AvtoVAZ
