= Izh =

Izh may refer to:

- IZh (Russian: ИЖ), a Russian automobile marque of the Izhevsk Machinebuilding Plant
- Izh (river) (Russian: Иж), Udmurt Republic, Russia
- Ingrian language, a Finnic language spoken by the Izhorians of Ingria

== See also ==
- Iž
