= Izhevsk Radio Plant =

Izhevsk Radio Plant (Russian: Ижевский радиозавод) is a company based in Izhevsk, Russia and established in 1958.

The Izhevsk Radio Plant Production Association, a producer of instrumentation for the Soviet military and space programs, currently produces satellite navigation and communications systems, telemetry systems, and radio equipment for civilian uses, as well as medical equipment and other products.
