= Azevka =

River in Russia

Location
- Country: Tatarstan, Russia

Physical characteristics
- Mouth: Izh
  - coordinates: 56°00′10″N 52°51′14″E
- Length: 23 km (14 mi)
- Basin size: 174 km^{2} (67 sq mi)

Basin features
- Progression: Izh→ Kama→ Volga→ Caspian Sea

The Azevka (Russian: Азевка; Tatar: Әҗәү) is a river the Agryzsky District of the Republic of Tatarstan, Russia. It is a left tributary of the Izh in the basin of the Kama.

== Geography ==
The Azevka begins in the hills of the right bank of the Kama River, at an elevation of 200 metres (660 ft) above sea level, and flows west. Below falls right tributary Сангас. Behind the village Jamurdino right river flows into the Chushkan. Below on the left bank of the village Urazaevo, the river flows into the Izh. Actually into the Gulf of Kama reservoir, formally, 17 kilometres (11 mi) from the river mouth. After the intended date of filling of the Kama Reservoir, the section of the river below Urazaevo gets into a zone of flooding. The river is 23 kilometres (14 mi) long, and its drainage basin covers 174 square kilometres (67 mi^{2}).
