= Trams in Izhevsk =

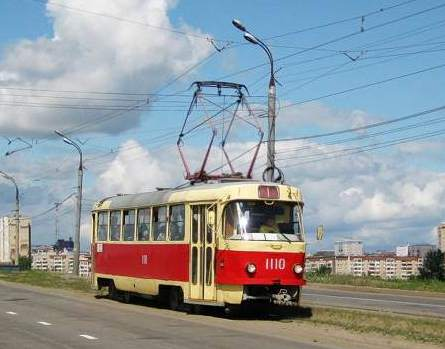

Operation
- Locale: Izhevsk, Udmurtia, Russia
- Open: 1935
- Lines: 11

Infrastructure
- Track gauge: 1,524 mm (5 ft)

Statistics
Overview

Trams in Izhevsk is the main surface transport network in Izhevsk, Udmurtia. The tramway was founded in 1935 and currently operates 11 tramlines.

== History ==
Tramway traffic was opened on the morning of 18 November 1935, eighteen months after the decision of the Presidium of the Izhevsk city Council. From this moment on Karl Marx street from Vyatsky lane to Votkinsk railway line ran the first route, whose length was 5 miles. A year later the route was extended on both ends — to Kazansky train station and Park them. Kirov. In 1941 he opened the movement of the tram through the street of Labour (now Lenin).

In the 60s the tram network is booming: in 1961 the introduction beskontaktnogo method of toll collection on the third route, from 1958 to single-track paths throughout the second path being completed in 1964, built new lines on the streets Halturina, line at Lenin street is expanding. Begins laying paths on the street Offline, Refractory; in 1966 the way to Kirov shall be extended until Bumala, in April 1965, was put into operation the second depot. Improve affect and car stock: in 1968, written off last cars with a wooden body, later another three years are written off last KTM/KTP-1, even after 2 years disappearing from the streets the trams KTM/KTP-1. As a result, the work remains only the Czech Татра Т3, first entered in Izhevsk in 1966. By 1969 the single-track lines remained, and a year later machines replaced the conductors on all routes.

Thus, during the period from 1963 to 1970 the company almost doubles the length of the paths increases from 36 to 64 km, the number of employees from five hundred to one thousand, the number of trams 104 (1965) up to 152 and is growing almost three times the number carried per year passenger — from 38.6 million to 100 million in 1976.

The opening of trolleybus movement in 1968 slowed the development of the tram: since the launch of high-speed trams in 1982 right-of-way, the current increased to 75.5 km, there is no change, the last route was opened in 1988 and since then, new routes appeared. In 1985 Poljakova celebrated the history of the tram service, then conducted the test with three-car trains.

A year later renumbering takes place — to three-digit numbers of cars on the front added "1" (first depot) and "2" (for second). In 1987 the first cars Tatra T6B5SU appear in Izhevsk. Ridership for 1990-the year amounted to $143,8 million, while the number of cars per decade increased from 203 to 244, of the peak number.

After the major flood in 1991, which led to a long period of decommissioning of the first depot, the further development of tram traffic develops quite slowly: first experiments with automatic announcement of stops in 1995, the purchase of four cars Tatra Т3RF in 1997, the appearance of the conductors in 1998, the purchase of ten cars Tatra T6B5RA in 2003, the decoupling of CME in 2011.

In 2011, the development of the tram (and public transportation in Izhevsk overall) embarked on a new stage in trams have electronic terminals, the tear-off coupons for travel was replaced by the printed receipts with the information on time, route, end points and the amount of payment, e-transportation card, reloadable through the terminals. In June 2012 on the website of the management company appeared to know the exact time of arrival of the tram at any stop.

In 2013, the management company of Highereducation completed the modernization of one of the cars. This tram with reduced power consumption and a number of other improvements that cost the company 5 million rubles, which is much cheaper than buying a new car. The updated car received a positive response, so if funding is planned to launch several more, up to ten.

In addition to the annual capital and current repairs of individual sections of tramways, according to the General development plan of the city of Izhevsk, 2006, provided for the laying of the tram lines in the districts: Alexander, North, Airport, Oriental, though in fact since that time no action in this direction has been taken.

In the beginning of 2014 from Berlin arrived 10 cars Tatra KT4DM. The cars were purchased in the framework of the project modernization of the tram fleet. After a small restyling they will come out 9 route(2 cars) and route 10(8 cars).
