= Elena Evseeva =

Russian ballerina

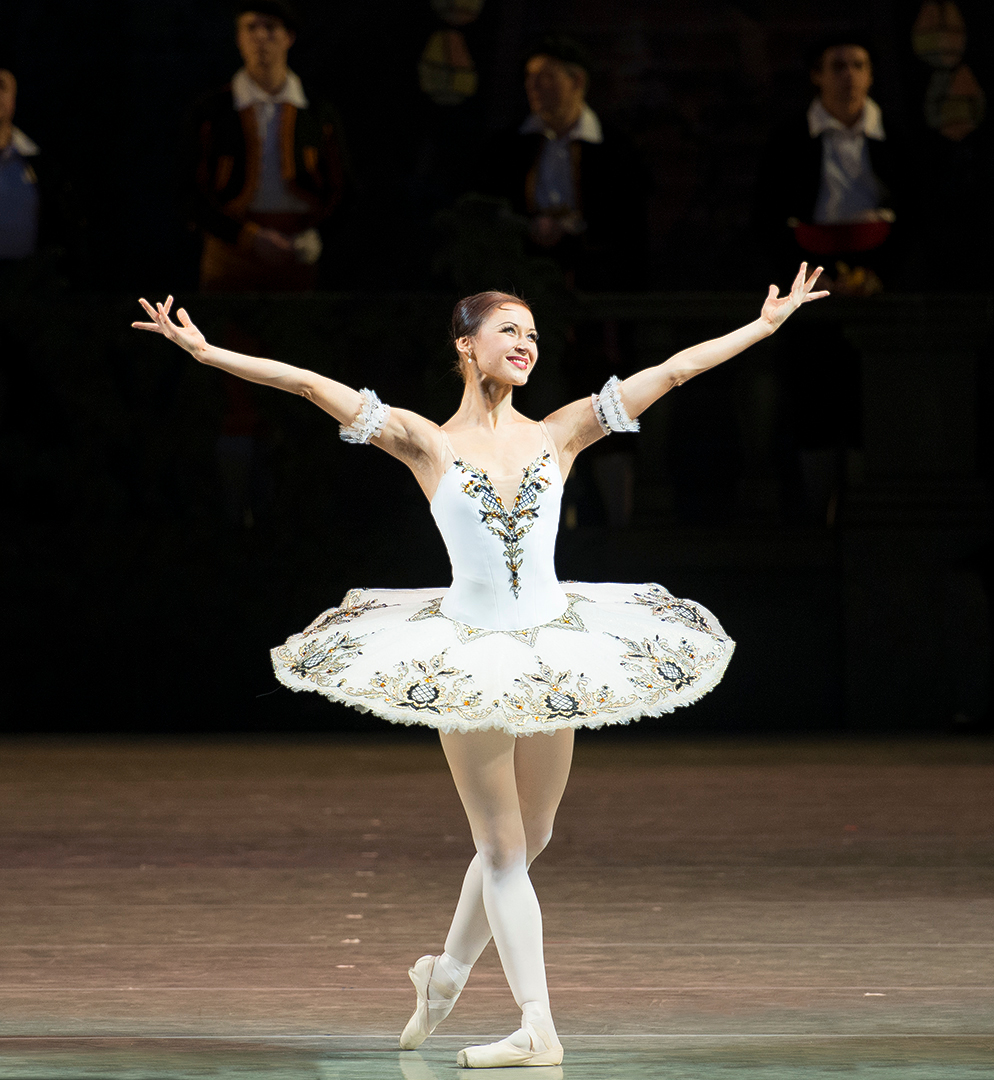
- Elena Evseeva in 2012
- Born: 13 December 1982 (age 42); Izhevsk, Russia
- Occupation: Ballerina
- Career
- Current group: Mariinsky Theatre
- Website: elena-evseeva.com%20elena-evseeva.com

Elena Evseeva (Russian: Елена Евсeева) (born 13 December 1982, Izhevsk) is a Russian ballerina, soloist of the Mikhailovsky (2001—2008) and the Mariinsky (since 2008) theaters. People's Artist of the Republic of Udmurtia.

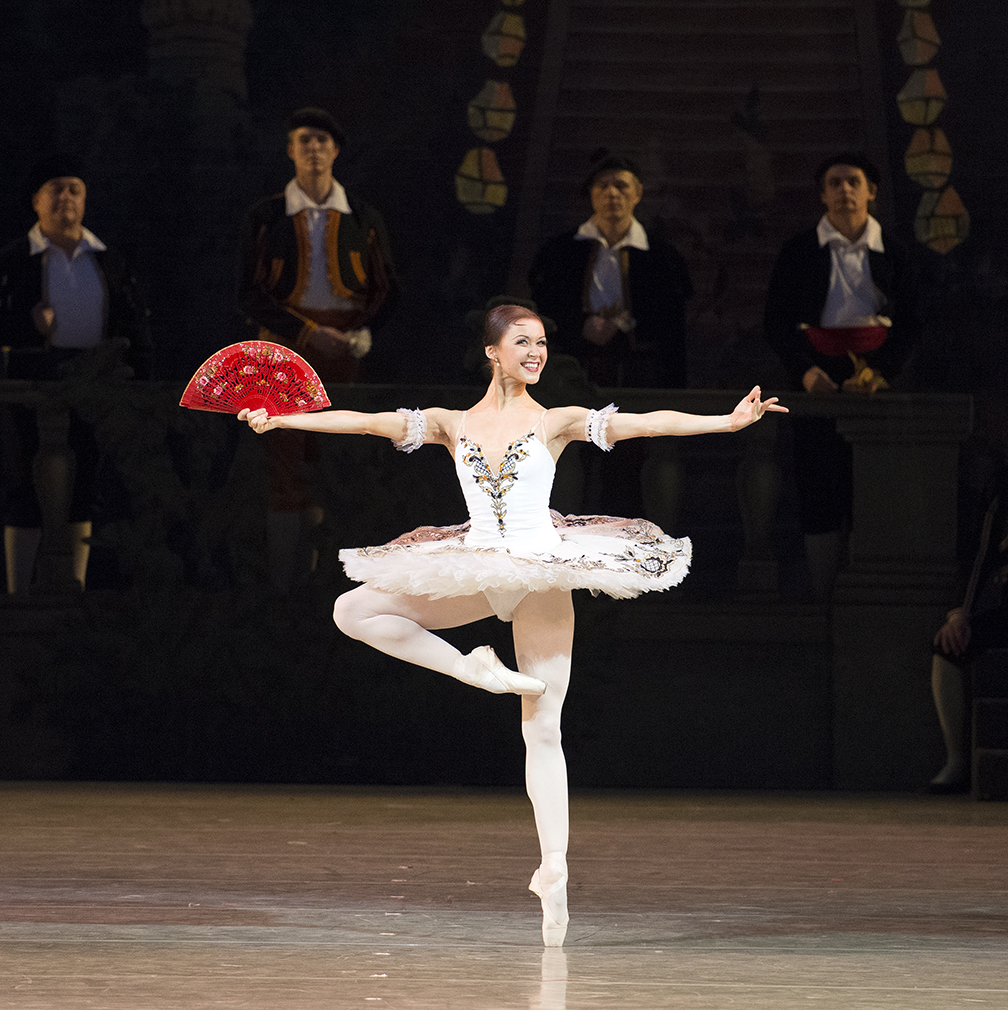
Elena Evseeva at the Mariinsky Theatre, 2012

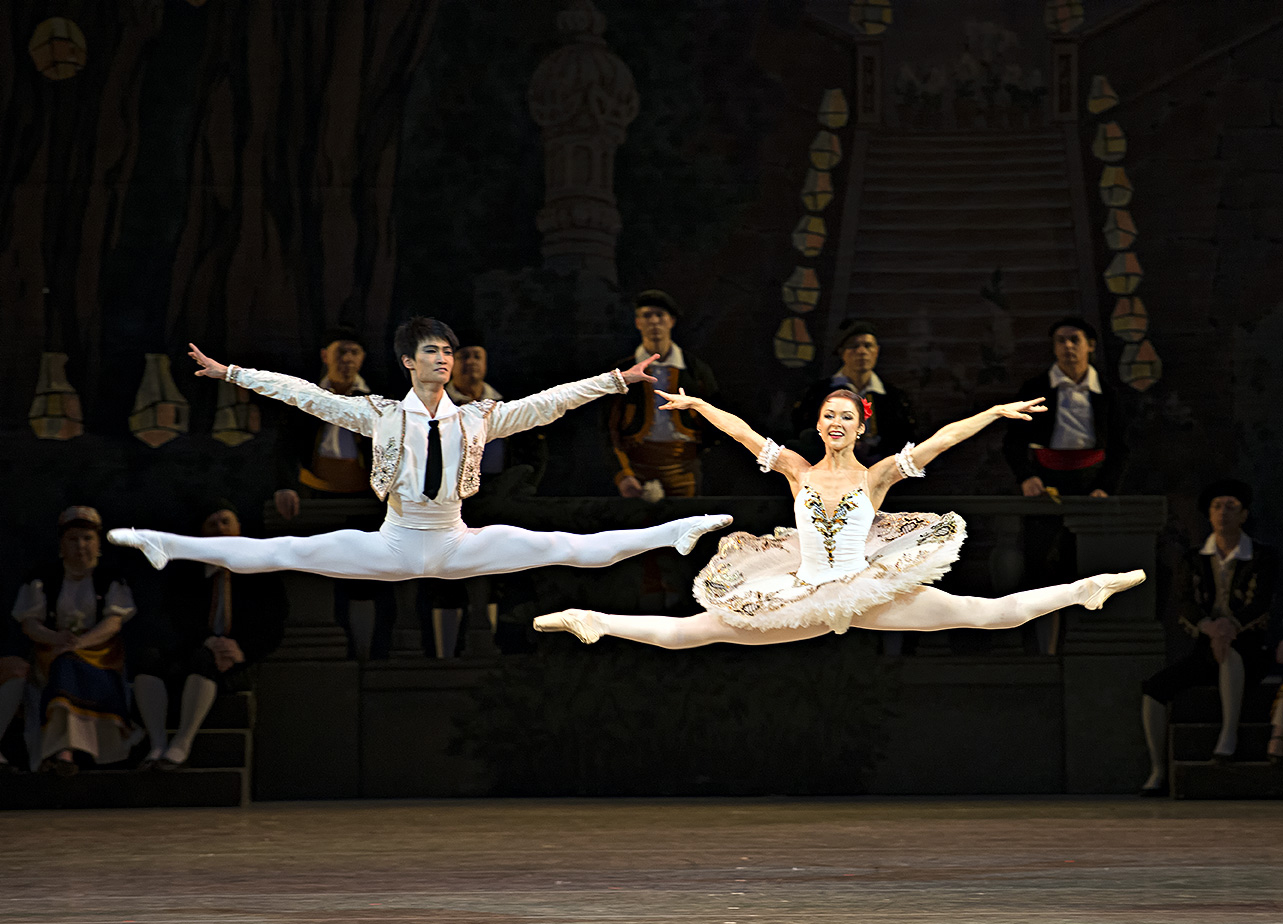
Elena Evseeva and Kimin Kim at the Mariinsky Theatre, 2012

== Biography ==
Elena Evseeva was born in Izhevsk; her father is an economist and mother a master of sports in artistic gymnastics. During her childhood she moved to Perm, where she joined the Perm Ballet School. At the age of 14, a teacher from the Ballet theater of Boris Eifman noticed Elena at the International Ballet Competition held in Moscow and advised her parents to transfer her to the Vaganova Academy of Russian Ballet. That’s how Elena came to study ballet in St. Petersburg. In 2001 she graduated from the Academy in the class of Honored Art Worker Marina Vasilieva and was taken to the ballet troupe of the Mikhailovsky Theatre. There she was a leading soloist from 2001 to 2008. Since 2008, she is dancing in the Mariinsky Theatre on the position of the first soloist. Evseeva works under the supervision of the teacher-tutor Lyubov Kunakova.

In 2009, dancing in a duet with Konstantin Zverev at Seoul International Ballet Competition, Evseeva won the first prize.

In 2011, she was awarded the title of Honored Artist of the Udmurt Republic.

== Repertoire ==
=== Mikhailovsky Theatre ===
- The Nutcracker : Mary
- The Sleeping Beauty : Diamond Fairy, Princess Aurora
- La Bayadère : Gamzatti
- Don Quixote : Kitri
- Le Corsaire : Medora
- Raymonda : Raymonda
- Giselle : Giselle
- Les Sylphides : Mazurka, Seventh Waltz
- Swan Lake : Odette and Odile
- Chipollino : Radish
- Spartacus : Aegina.
- Walpurgis Night, ballet fragment in Faust — choreography by Georgy Kovtun

=== Mariinsky Theatre ===
- La Sylphide in La Sylphide — choreography by August Bournonville in the version of Elsa—Marianne von Rosen;
- Giselle, Zulma, pas de deux of act I, in Giselle — choreography by Jean Coralli, Jules Perrot and Marius Petipa;
- Gamzatti, La Bayadere — choreography by Marius Petipa, in the version of Vladimir Ponomarev and Vakhtang Chabukiani;
- Gulnara, Odalisque in Le Corsaire — staged by Pyotr Gusev based on the composition and choreography by Marius Petipa;
- variation, Grand pas in Paquita — choreography by Marius Petipa;
- pas de trois of the act I in Swan Lake — choreography by Marius Petipa and Lev Ivanov, in the version of Konstantin Sergeyev;
- Kitri in Don Quixote — choreography by Marius Petipa and Alexander Gorsky;
- Seventh Waltz, Prelude, Eleventh Waltz, Mazurka in Les Sylphides — choreography by Michel Fokine;
- Soloist in Les noces — choreography by Bronislava Nijinska;
- Mary in The Fountain of Bakhchisarai — choreography by Rostislav Zakharov;
- Mary in The Nutcracker — choreography by Vasily Vainonen
- The young lady in The Lady and the Hooligan — choreography by Konstantin Boyarsky;
- Syuimbike in Shurale — choreography by Leonid Yakobson;
- Bacchante in Walpurgis Night — choreography by Leonid Lavrovsky;
- dance of gold, Shirin in Legend of Love — choreography by Yury Grigorovich;
- Fanny Cerrito in Pas de Quatre — choreography by Anton Dolin.
- ballets by George Balanchine:
  - Polyhymnia in Apollo,
  - Waltz,
  - Tarantella,
  - Soloist of the part III in Symphony in C,
  - Tschaikovsky Pas de Deux,
  - Butterfly in Midsummer Night's Dream;
- Mary, The Nutcracker — production by Mihail Chemiakin, choreography by Kirill Simonov;
- Thin girl, Cinderella in Cinderella — choreography by Alexei Ratmansky;
- ballets by William Forsythe:
  - In the Middle Somewhat Elevated,
  - Approximate Sonata;
- Two naiads in Ondine — choreography by Pierre Lacotte;
- Hours in Glass Heart — choreography by Kirill Simonov.
- Parasha in The Bronze Horseman — staged by Yuri Smekalov
- Without — choreography by Benjamin Millepied;
- Infra — choreography by Wayne McGregor.
- Waltz by Moritz Moszkowski
- The Talisman — choreography by Marius Petipa;
- Katerina in The Tale of the Stone Flower — choreography by Yury Grigorovich

Also in the repertoire

- Pas de deux of Diana and Actaeon in La Esmeralda — choreography by Agrippina Vaganova;
- Pas de six in La Vivandiere — choreography by Arthur Saint-Léon;
- Grand Pas Classique — choreography by Victor Gsovsky;
- Torrents of Spring — choreography Kasyan Goleizovsky as amended by Vadim Desnitsky;
- Torrents of Spring — choreography by Asaf Messerer;
- Pas de deux in Flames of Paris — choreography by Vasili Vainonen;
- Bhakti — choreography by Maurice Béjart;
- Labyrinth — choreography by Kseniya Zvereva.
- Laurenci, Pase-de-sis in Laurencia — choreography by Vakhtang Chabukiani

== Awards ==
- 2011: Honored Artist of the Republic of Udmurtia
- 2019: Golden Sofit Award
- 2023: People's Artist of the Republic of Udmurtia
