= Izhevsk railway station =

Railway station in Leninský district, Russia

Izhevsk Ижевск
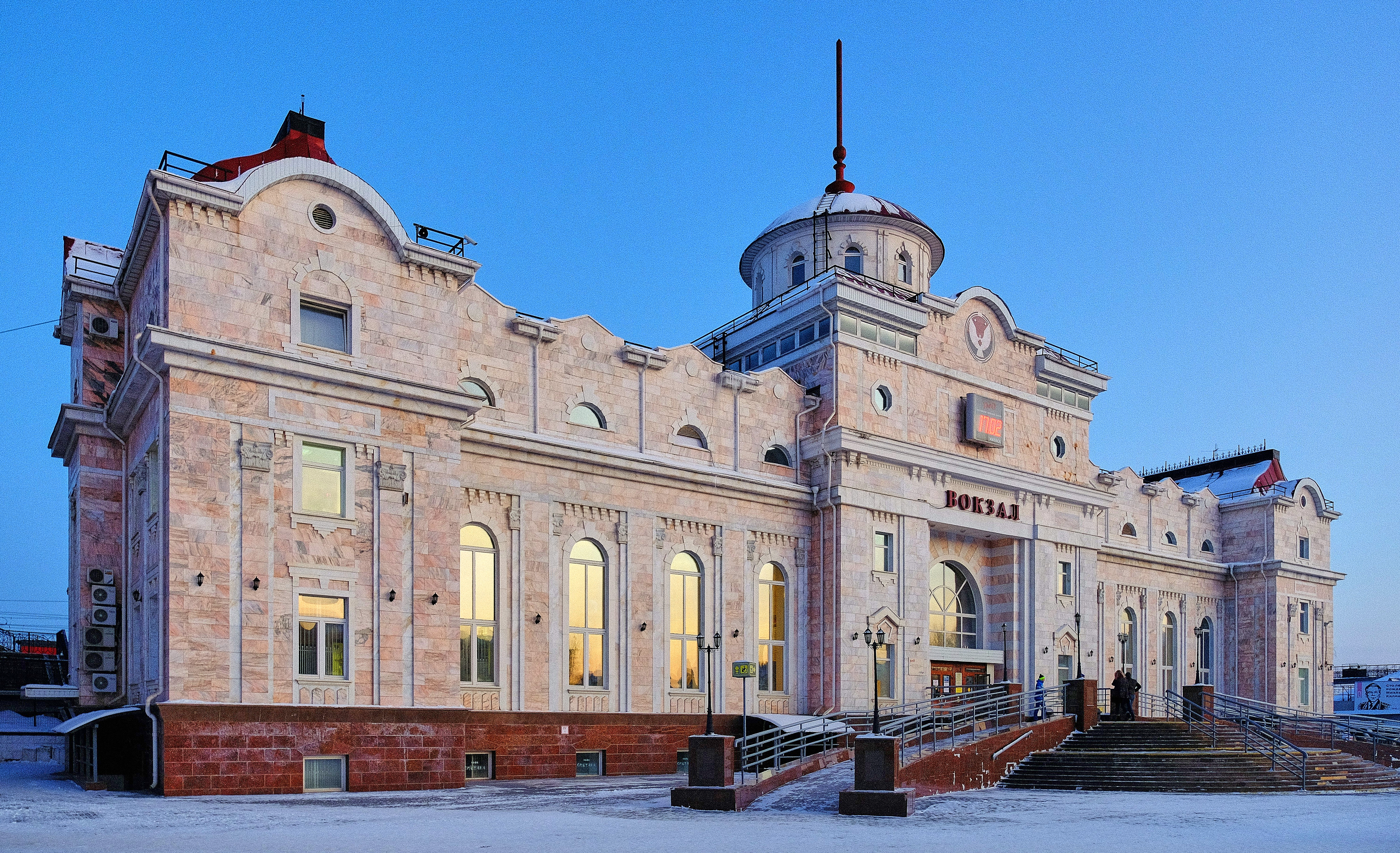
- View of the station from street.

General information
- Location: Druzhby Street, Leninsky District, Izhevsk, Russia
- Coordinates: 56.8019°N 53.1893°E
- System: Gorky Railway terminal
- Owner: Russian Railways (Gorky Railway)
- Platforms: 3 (2 island platforms)
- Tracks: 12

Construction
- Parking: yes

Other information
- Station code: 255409
- Fare zone: 0

History
- Opened: 1919
- Electrified: 1990
- Former names: Izhevsk I
Location

Izhevsk railway station (Russian: Ижевск) is a railway station in the capital of Udmurtia — Izhevsk in Russia.

== Main information ==
It includes the main building (built in 1952–1954), suburban terminal (built in 1971 and renovated in 2009) and a number of service buildings.

== Trains ==
This is a list of trains that pass the station:

- Moscow — Izhevsk
- Yekaterinburg — Izhevsk
- Nizhny Novgorod — Izhevsk
- St.Petersburg — Izhevsk
- Adler — Perm
- Novorossiysk — Perm
- Kirov — Kazan
- Novorossiysk — Izhevsk
- Adler — Izhevsk
- Anapa — Izhevsk

== Gallery ==
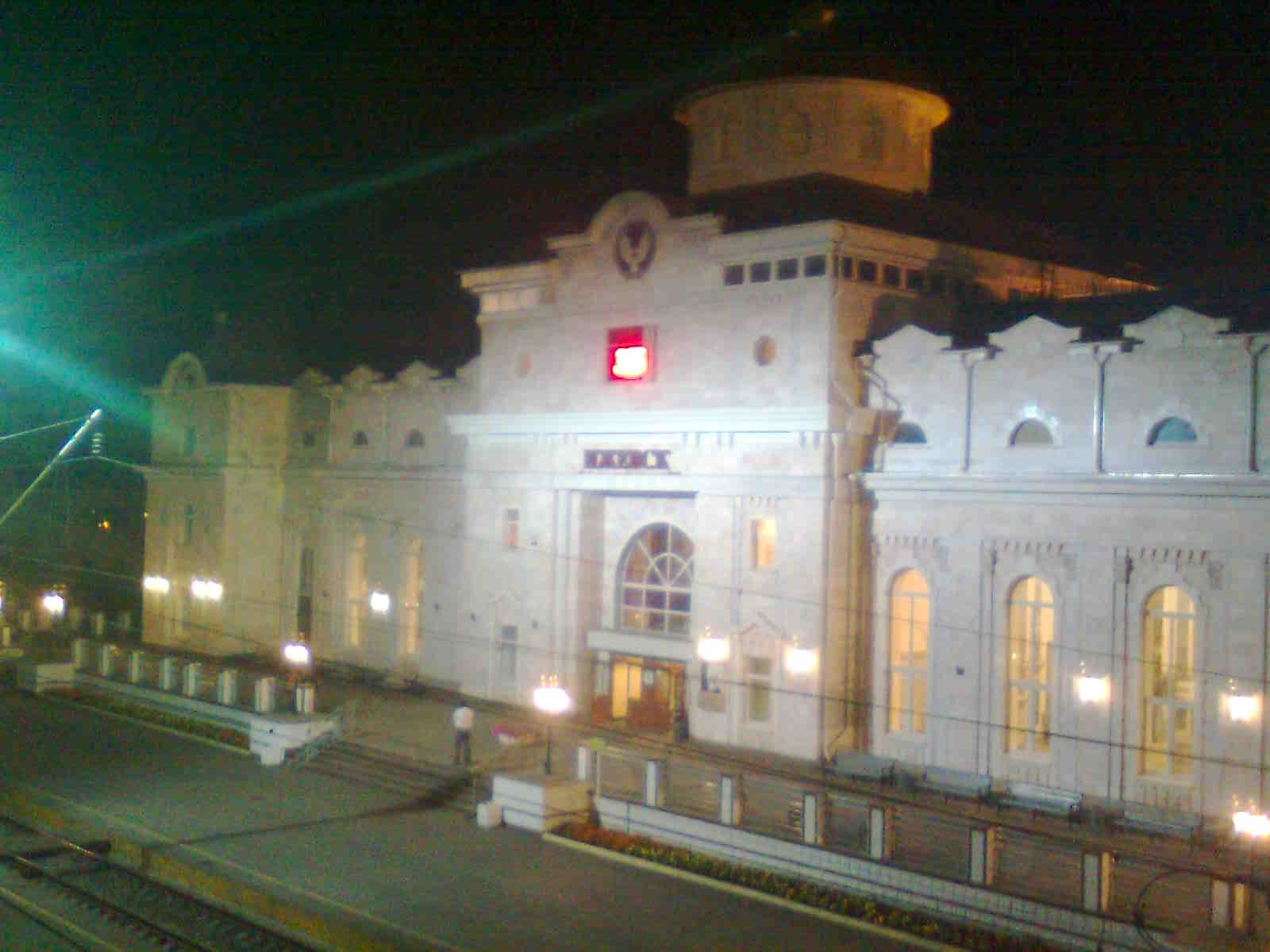
Station at night

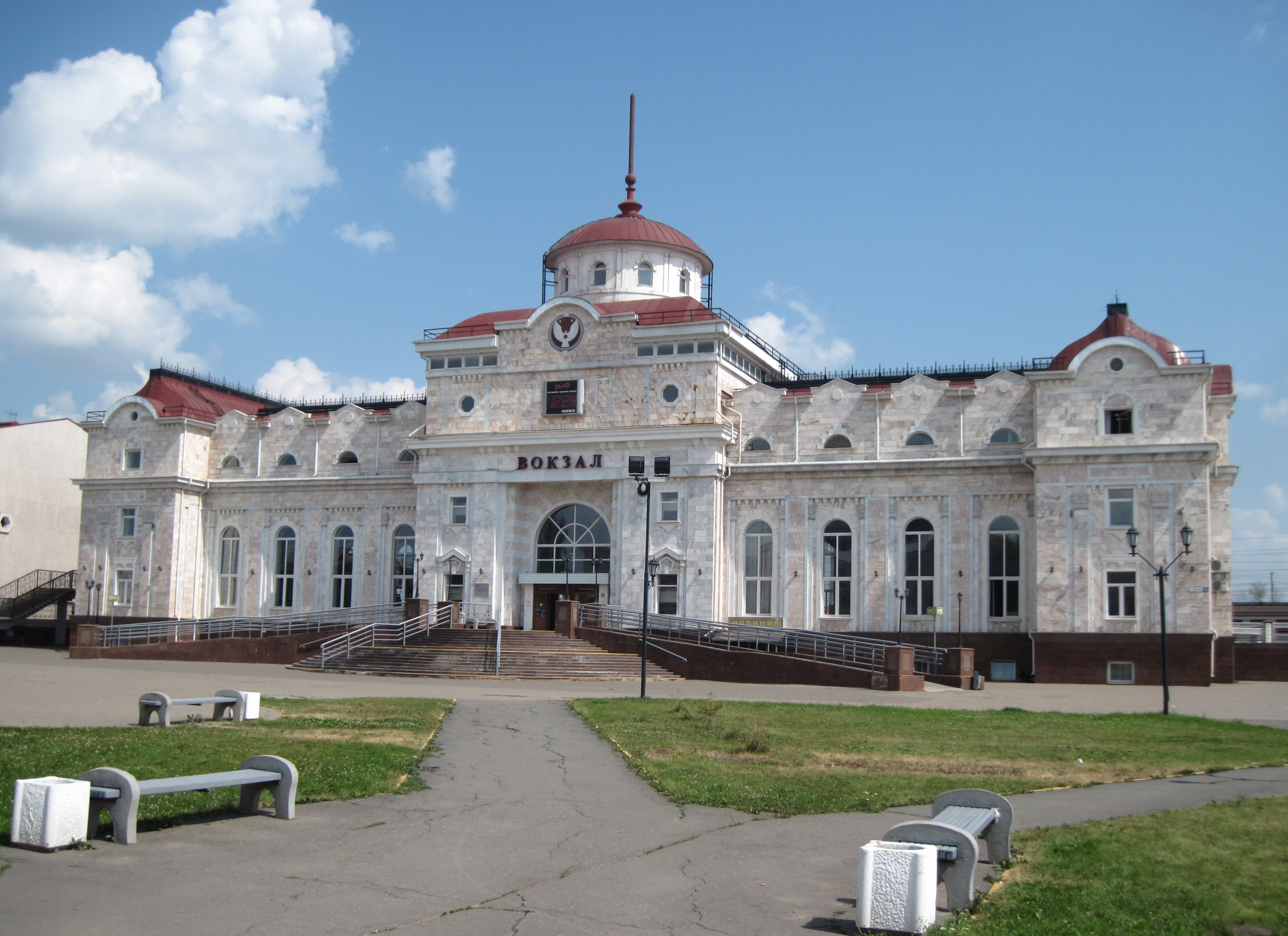
Main building facade

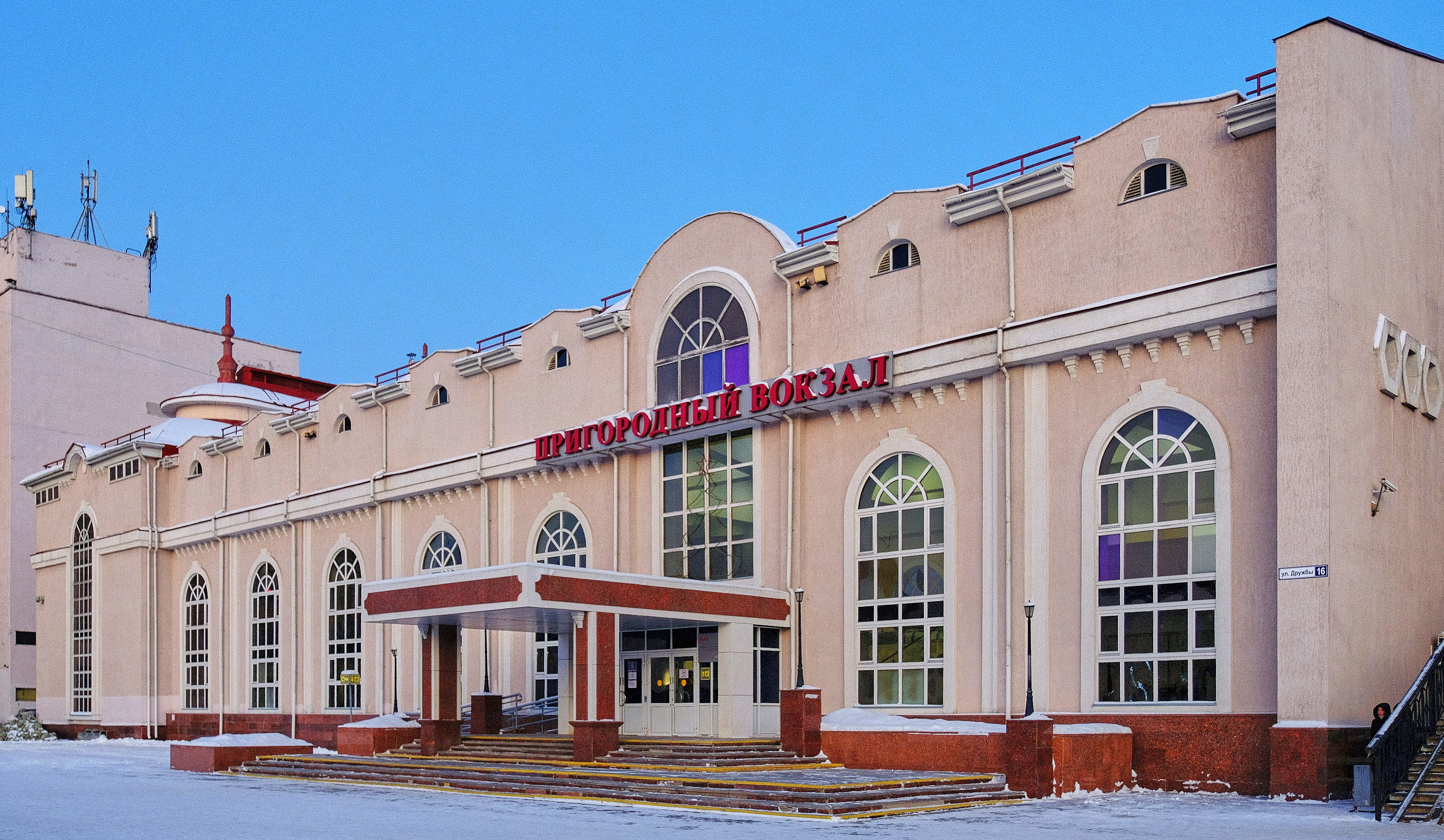
Suburban terminal building

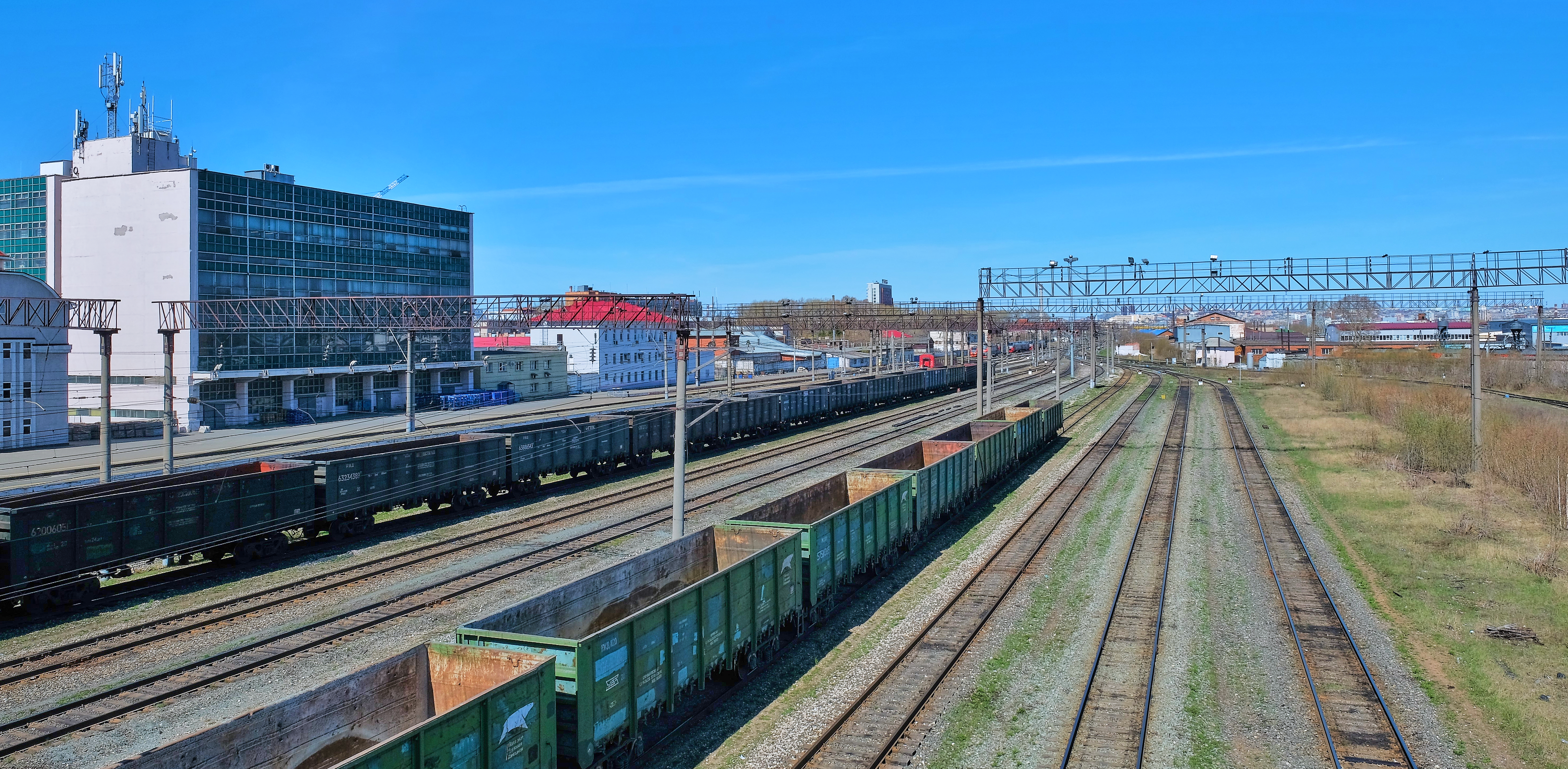
Tracks
