= Izhevsk Reservoir =

Izhevsk Pond
- Ижевский пруд (Russian)
- A photo from ca. 1900

- Location within Russia
- Location: Udmurtia, Russia
- Coordinates: 56°52′55″N 53°07′58″E
- Type: Reservoir
- River sources: Izh River, Yagul River
- Built: 1760

The Izhevsk Pond (Russian: Ижевский пруд) is an artificial body of water, or reservoir, created in 1760 at the urging of Peter Ivanovich Shuvalov for the needs of an iron works in Izhevsk, Russia. It is placed at the confluence of the Izh River and its tributary, the Yagul.

The reservoir was filled with water necessary for the factory's operation by June 1763. The dam was reconstructed by Alexander Deryabin in the early 19th century and underwent further modernization in 1984.

A number of industrial enterprises skirt the reservoir, and its embankment is the most important esplanade in the capital of Udmurtia.

It possible to travel by motorship from Izhevsk pier at the eastern end of the pond to Volozhka pier at the western end. Motorships include the Москва-181 (Moscow-181). Volozhka (Воложка) is popular during the summer with swimmers (despite being polluted by nearby industries) and with people owning dachas.
