= Izh (river) =

Izh, İj, Otš
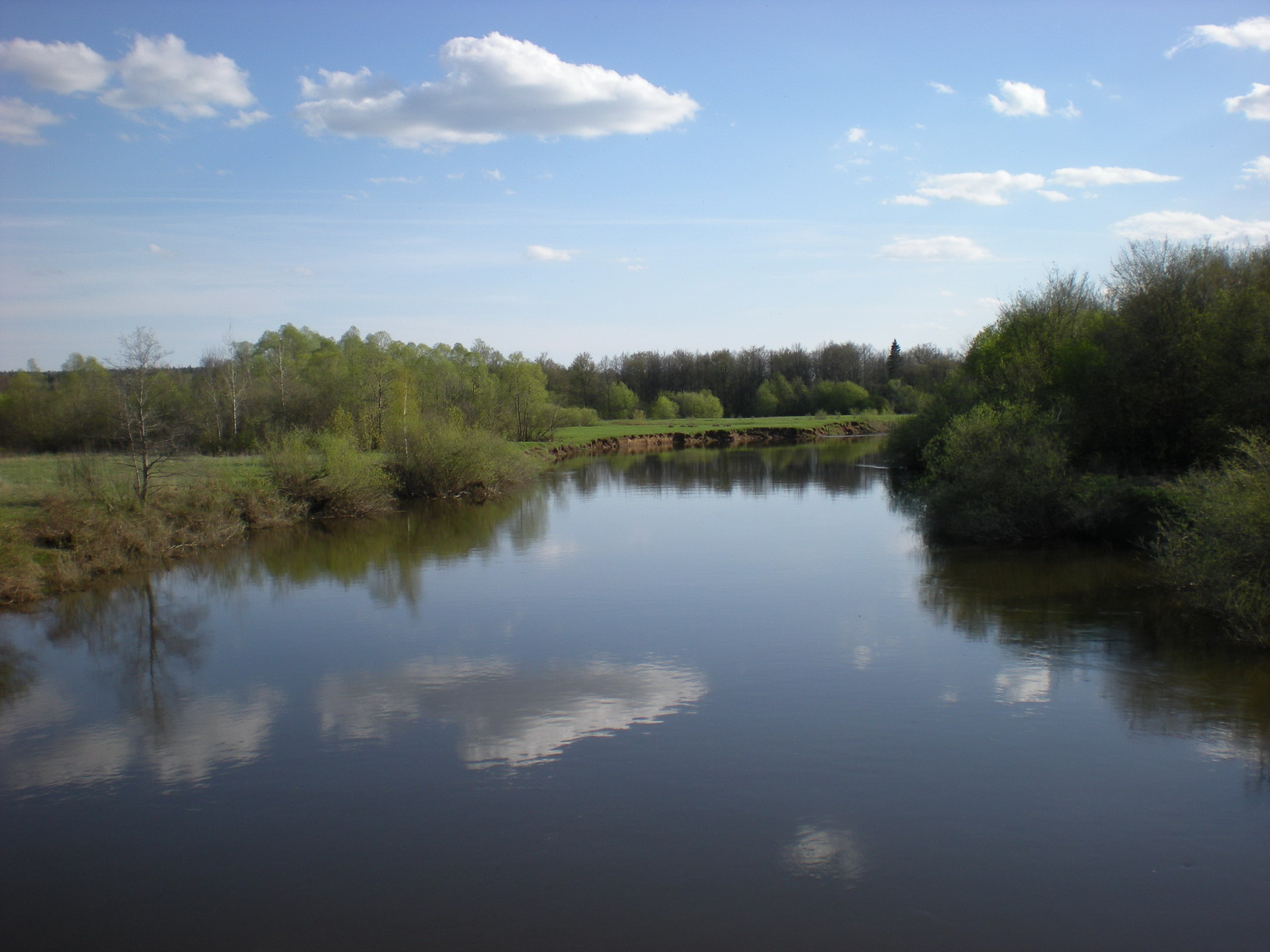

Location
- Country: Udmurtia and Tatarstan, Russia

Physical characteristics
- Source
  - location: Malye Oshvortsy, Udmurtia
- Mouth: Kama
  - location: Nizhnekamsk Reservoir
  - coordinates: 56°02′15″N 52°54′04″E
- Length: 259 km (161 mi)
- Basin size: 8,510 km^{2} (3,290 sq mi)
- Discharge
  - average: 587 m^{3}/s (20,700 cu ft/s), maximum in 1979

Basin features
- Progression: Kama→ Volga→ Caspian Sea

The Izh (Russian: Иж; Udmurt: Оӵ, Oč; Tatar: Иж, romanized: İj [iʒ]) is a river in Udmurtia and Tatarstan, Russian Federation, a right-bank tributary of the Kama. It is 259 kilometres (161 mi) long, of which 97 kilometres (60 mi) are in Tatarstan, and its drainage basin covers 8,510 square kilometres (3,290 mi^{2}). It begins near Malye Oshvortsy, Udmurtia and falls to the Nizhnekamsk Reservoir, Kama River, near Golyushurma tract in Agryzsky District, Tatarstan.

The river's major tributaries are the Agryzka, Chazh, Kyrykmas, Varzinka, Varzi and Azevka rivers. The mineralization 300 to 500 mg/L. Its drainage is regulated. The Izhevsk Reservoir was constructed in 1760 to supply Izhevsk industry with water. Since 1978 it is protected as a natural monument of Tatarstan. There are notable mineral springs in Izh valley. Izhevsk and Agryz are the cities along the river.
