= Izhevsk =

Izhevsk Ижевск
- City

Other transcription(s)
  - Udmurt: Ижкар, Иж
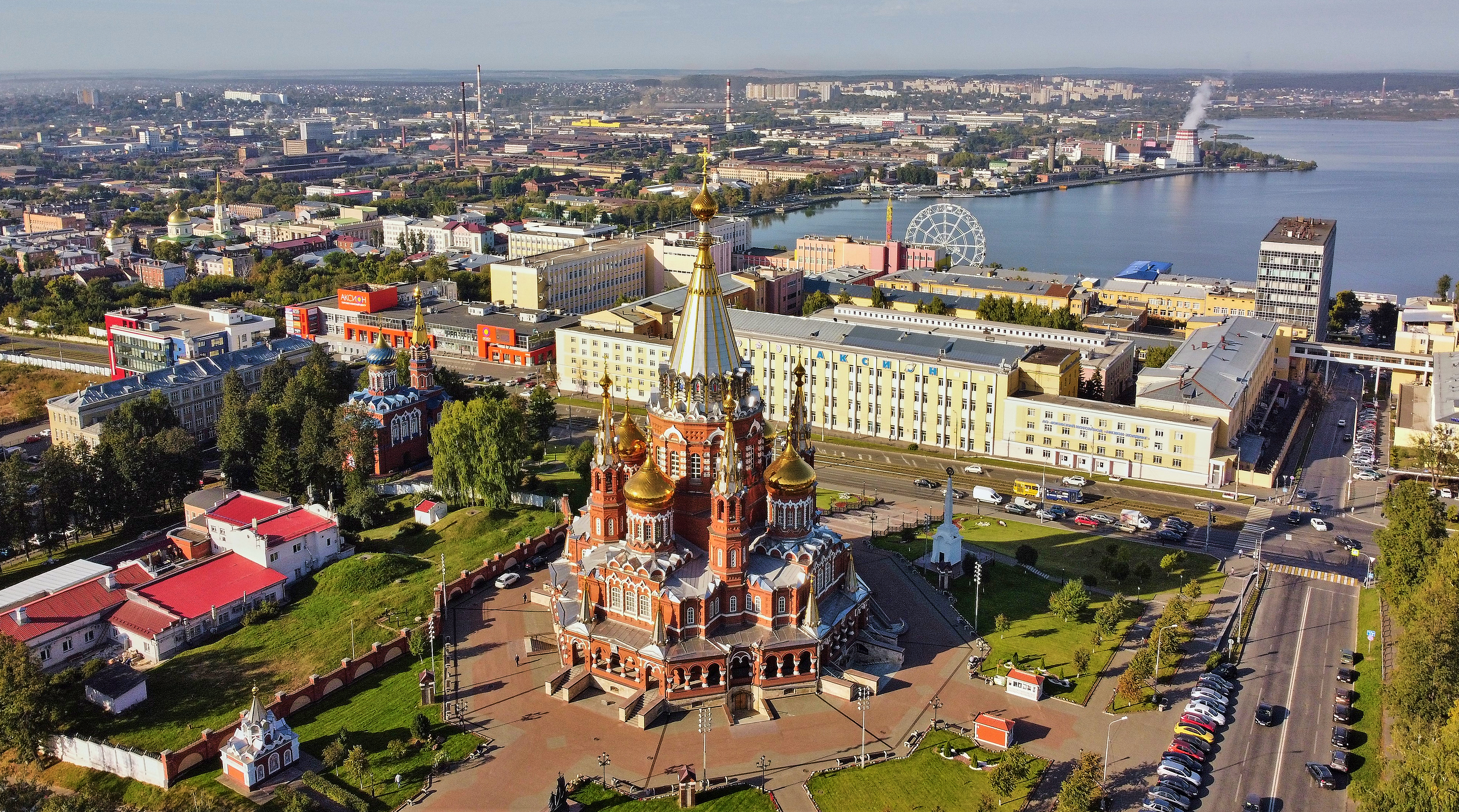
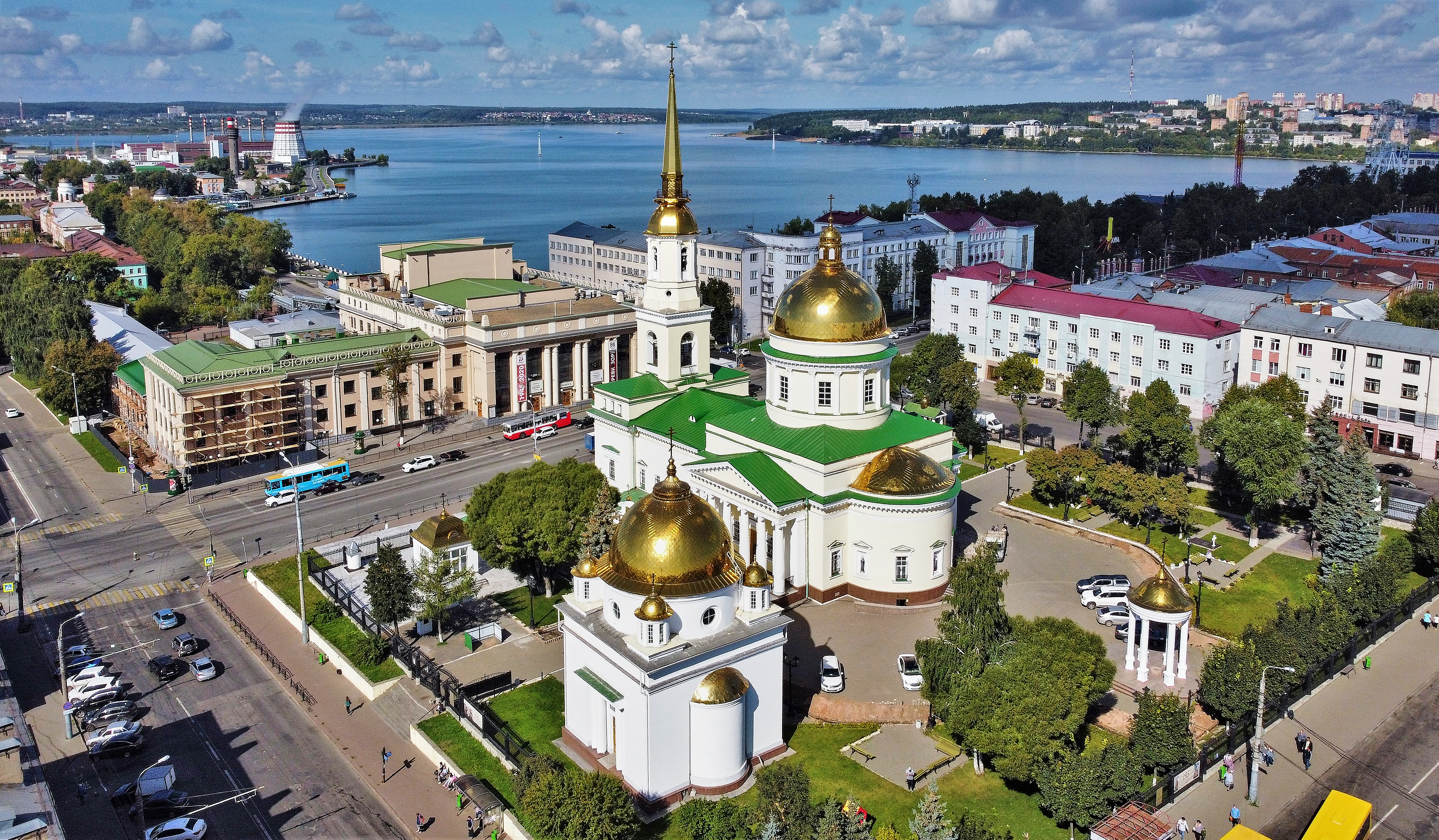
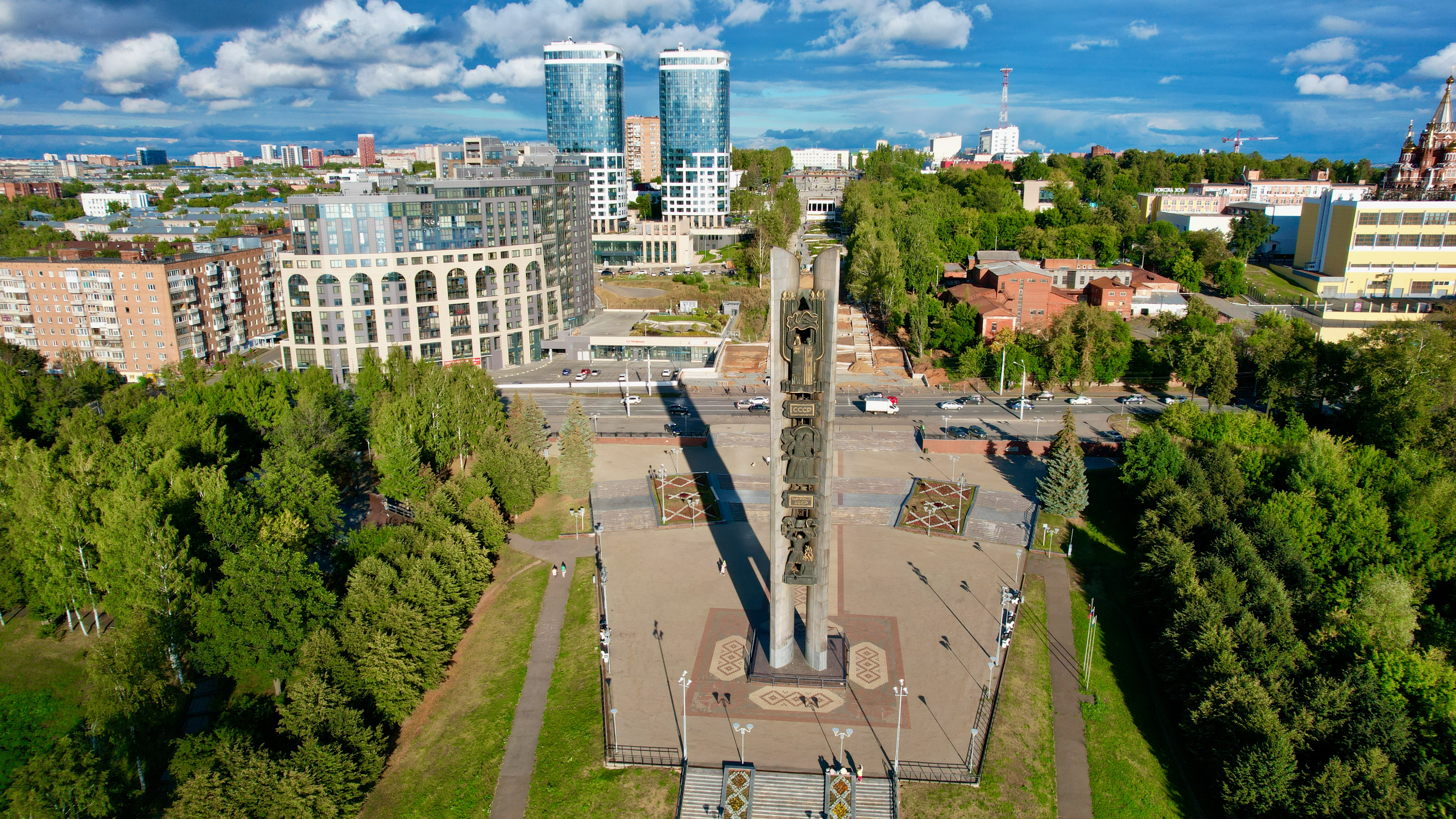
- St. Michael's Cathedral Russian Drama Theater of Udmurtia The Arsenal of the Izhevsk Arms Factory Alexander Nevsky Cathedral Monument Druzhba Narodov Architect Dudin Embankment

- Flag Coat of arms
- Interactive map of Izhevsk
- Location of Izhevsk Izhevsk (European Russia) Izhevsk (Russia) Izhevsk (Europe)
- Coordinates: 56°50′N 53°11′E
- Country: Russia
- Federal subject: Udmurtia
- Founded: April 10, 1760

Government
  - Body: City Duma
  - Head: Dmitry Chistyakov

Area
  - Total: 315.15 km^{2} (121.68 sq mi)
- Elevation: 140 m (460 ft)

Population (2010 Census)
  - Total: 627,733
  - Estimate (2025): 642,023 (+2.3%)
  - Rank: 19th in 2010
  - Density: 1,991.9/km^{2} (5,158.9/sq mi)

Administrative status
  - Subordinated to: city of republic significance of Izhevsk
  - Capital of: Udmurt Republic
  - Capital of: city of republic significance of Izhevsk

Municipal status
  - Urban okrug: Izhevsk Urban Okrug
  - Capital of: Izhevsk Urban Okrug
- Time zone: UTC+4 (MSK+1)
- Postal codes: list 426000, 426003, 426004, 426006–426011, 426015, 426016, 426019, 426021, 426023, 426025, 426027, 426028, 426030, 426032–426036, 426038, 426039, 426041, 426049–426054, 426056–426058, 426060–426063, 426065, 426067–426070, 426072–426077, 426700, 426880, 426890, 426899, 426910, 426960–426965, 426970, 426999, 901009, 901143, 901145, 901147, 993100
- Dialing code: +7 3412
- OKTMO ID: 94701000001
- City Day: June 12
- Website: www.izh.ru/en/welcome

Izhevsk (Note: Alternatively transliterated as Ijevsk; Russian: Иже́вск, IPA: [ɪˈʐɛfsk]; Udmurt: Ижкар, romanized: Ižkar, or Иж, Iž) is the capital city of Udmurtia, Russia. It is situated along the Izh River, west of the Ural Mountains in Eastern Europe. It is the 21st-largest city in Russia, and the most populous in Udmurtia, with over 600,000 inhabitants.

From 1984 to 1987, the city was called Ustinov (Russian: Усти́нов), named after Soviet defence minister Dmitry Ustinov. The city is a major hub of industry, commerce, politics, culture and education in the Volga Region. It is known for its defense, engineering and metallurgy industries. Izhevsk holds the titles of Armory Capital of Russia and the City of Labor Glory.

== History ==
=== Pioneer settlements ===
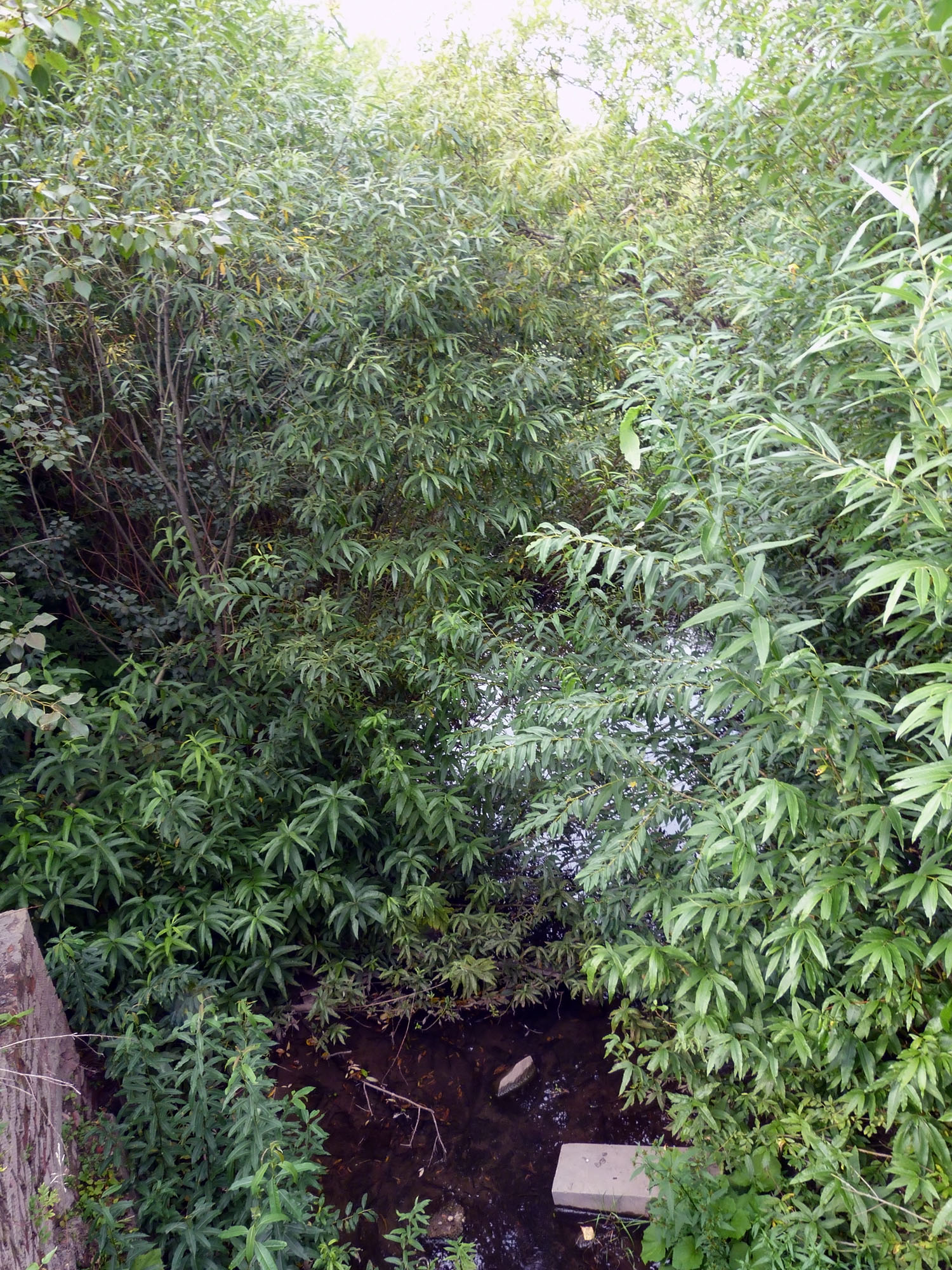
Karlutka River

The pioneer settlements on the territory where modern Izhevsk now stands were founded by Udmurts in the 5th century. There were two fortified settlements situated on the banks of the Karlutka River. Later this territory joined the Khanate of Kazan. In 1552, Russia conquered the Khanate and, in 1582, Ivan the Terrible conferred the lands by the Karlutka and Izh Rivers on Bagish Yaushev, a Tatar morza. The quit-rent had been imposed on the Udmurt population ever since. The Yaushevs owned the land until the reign of Peter the Great (1682–1721).

=== Ironworks construction ===
On September 15, 1757, Count Pyotr Shuvalov, owner of seven factories in the Urals, bought land in the Kama Region and got permission from Empress Elizabeth to build three ironworks there. In those days, ironworks were powered with steam, and wood was the only fuel. For that reason it was decided to build one of the plants on the forest-rich land near the Izh River and make iron bands and cast iron anchors. Another ironworks was built on the Votka River.

In April 10, 1760, serfs from neighboring villages and artisans from other Shuvalov's plants began dam construction under the direction of Alexey Moskvin, a mining engineer and a trustee of Shuvalov. This date is considered to be the date of Izhevsk's foundation. Construction proceeded at a slow pace. The serfs were unhappy with being taken from their villages, with arduous duties and regular physical punishment, leading to tumultuous rebellions.

In 1762 Shuvalov died. His son Andrey inherited the factories. In accordance with the ukase of Catherine the Great dated November 15, 1763, all Shuvalov's ironworks, including the one at Izhevsky Zavod, lapsed to the Crown for debts. Since that time, it has been under the authority of the Collegium of Mining, an institution in charge of the Russian mining industry. The ironworks on the Izh and Votka Rivers were called Kama Plants.

In 1763 construction of the dam and ironworks was completed and the first bloomery iron was smelted. As a result of the dam construction, the Izhevsk Reservoir, one of the biggest in Europe was formed. Near the ironworks, the settlement was built. This settlement was named Izhevsky Zavod, meaning "the factory on the Izh" in Russian.

Initially the ironworks made palm-wide iron bands from 3–6 metres (9.8–19.7 ft) long. These bands were supplied to Moscow for the rebuilding of the Kremlin. The iron from Izhevsky Zavod was also used for construction in Saint Petersburg.

=== Pugachev's Rebellion ===
In October 1773, the news of the popular revolt against Catherine II on the Yaik and the manifestos of Yemelyan Pugachev reached Izhevsky Zavod. The Cossack passing himself off as Peter III proclaimed liberty for serfs and called for killing nobles and factory owners. This had the backing of the serfs and artisans. So Colonel Feodor Wenzel, the manager of the Goroblagodat and Kama plants, and Aleksey Alymov, the manager of Izhevsky Zavod ironworks, were forced to escape to Kazan.

On January 1, 1774, a detachment of Yemelyan Pugachev's rebel army reached the town. The rebels destroyed the ironworks, burned its office buildings, and wrecked the houses of the managers. They demolished the food depot and distributed the food to the people. The ironworks money was sent to the staff of the rebel army, near Ufa. The serfs were freed. Some of them joined the detachment. Iron production stopped for a while. Around this time, Catherine realized the seriousness of the rebellion and sent an army led by General Aleksandr Bibikov to crush the insurrection. In April 1774, Pugachev's army fought losing battles everywhere and was forced to leave Izhevsky Zavod. The managers returned and cowed serfs and artisans into submission, forcing them to pledge allegiance to Catherine the Great. A list of workers who had joined the rebel army was compiled for future reprisal.

In spite of opposition from the forces of Wenzel and Alymov Brothers, Pugachev's army occupied the town again on June 27, 1774. The crowds hailed Yemelyan Pugachev. He dealt with the complaints of serfs and workers for two days. Forty-two persons, including Wenzel and the Alymovs, were executed. On June 29, Pugachev left Izhevsky Zavod and set out for Kazan. Many workmen of Izhevsky Zavod joined his detachments and fought selflessly in the last battles of the Rebellion, which was mostly crushed by early September 1775. In spite of the defeat of the rebel army and the execution of its leader, bands of rebels continued to fight. New managers of the ironworks suppressed serfs and brought back artisans by force, cracking down on the bands of rebels.

The ironworks was restored and began to function by the end of 1775. The former order was reinstated. The forced laborers weren't interested in boosting productivity and the practice fell into decay by the 19th century.

=== Arms factory foundation ===
In 1800, Emperor Paul I ordered an arms factory built in the Urals in view of a mounting threat from Napoleonic France. Andrew Deryabin, a mining engineer, chief of Goroblagodat, Perm, Kama and Bogoslov plants, chose the site for the new plant. He saw several places in the Perm and Vyatka governorates and concluded that the most suitable place for plant foundation was Izh Zavod. It occurred to him to turn the ironworks into the armory.

Alexander I approved of Deryabin's project and construction began on the arms factory building on June 10, 1807, considered the year of Izhevsk's second birth.

The new factory had a shortage of manpower. Staff vacancies were filled by serfs, workmen from Urals mining plants and recruits. Armorers were transferred from other arms factories and hired from Europe, mainly from Denmark and Sweden.

The population of the settlement grew quickly so that by the end of 1808 there were more than 6,000 inhabitants. Because of housing requirements, people had to build their houses after work, at night. Houses were made from wood found in forests near the factory. At the same time, workers built new barracks for the soldiers and housing for factory employees, officers and officials, the hospital, schools and other social facilities.

=== Dudin's plan ===
The settlement was built according to the master plan. Architect Feodor Dudin was an author of this plan and a director of all construction works. The principle of an urban grid was the basis of the new master plan. Wide and straight streets crossed side streets running perpendicular to them. Their accurate network formed small rectangular blocks.

On May 18, 1810, a major fire burned in Izhevsky Zavod. 174 houses, the warehouse, and two wooden churches were destroyed.

After the fire, implementation of Dudin's plan began. The houses were made of pinewood logs. As a rule, a house consisted of two izbas, joined with an inner porch. Houses of the poor consisted of one izba. Armorers and officials erected two-storied and five-wall log houses. There were 15 streets in Izh by the 1820s. In 1812, Izhevsky Zavod was divided into three administrative parts because of growth in population and territory. In 1816, there were 1,710 houses, 8 factory stone buildings, a prison, a cemetery, a stone church and a school in the settlement. The population was 8,324.

In the 1820s, 1830s, and 1840s, a number of large stone building was erected. St. Alexander Nevsky Cathedral was built between 1818 and 1823, and visited by Tsar Alexander (who considered Alexander Nevsky his patron saint) shortly after its completion. Other noteworthy large stone buildings which still remain from that era include the Arsenal (1823–25), Public Offices (1843–45) and house of contractor Egor Novikov. All improved Izhevsk's appearance.

By 1850, the settlement had more than doubled, to population of 19,163. Its territory was about 6200 square miles. 3499 buildings were wooden, and 27 others, including three churches, were made of stone. The settlement had 1066 wells.

=== Izhevsky Zavod after the Emancipation Reform of 1861 ===
On February 19, 1861, Emperor of Russia Alexander II carried out the Emancipation Reform. On October 9, 1865, Berg-kollegia, apprehending a prospective cost increase, leased the arms factory to a partnership of industrialists.

In 1866, serfs of the factory obtained their liberty with the 1861 Emancipation Manifesto and gained self-government. Izhevsky Zavod was divided into two volosts: Nagornaya Volost and Zarechnaya Volost, or Zareka. Each volost had its board of administration and consisted of rural groups. Rural circles were headed by a starosta, selected in the gathering. There were seven rural societies in Nagornaya Volost; Zarechnaya Volost consisted of four.

Administrations of volosts reported to the Board of Sarapul Zemstvo. They were led by volost starshinas, elected for three years. Volost administrations were in charge of doing duty and paying taxes. They issued passports, managed improvement of territory and other local affairs.

Administrative and police oversight was carried out by the factory administration. Besides the administration delivered documents of title to land and house. The ponds, pastures and hayfields were turned over to the armorers and artisans.

The abolition of serfdom aggravated wealth inequalities between the inhabitants of Izhevsky Zavod. Well-to-do sections of population included the factory management, skilled armorers and artisans, administrative professionals, officials, clergy and merchants. Such stratification had an influence on view of the settlement. Working people were driven out of Nagornaya Part and settled in boggy Zareka. At that time, Koltoma, another working-class locality, grew. In the early 1870s, there were about twenty private stone buildings in Izhevsky Zavod. In Zarechnaya Part all houses were made of wood.

Civic life depended on government contract work. In the years of war or army re-equipment, the orders grew, and so did the workforce and labour earnings. After the government orders were filled and wages were cut, most workmen left the arms factory and the settlement fell into decay until the next government contract.

=== Enterprises in Izhevsky Zavod ===
In 1872, the steel works was founded in Izhevsky Zavod. In 1884, the arms factory and the steel works passed to the state.

Private armories appeared in Izhevsky Zavod.

- In 1860, an armorer named Ivan Fyodorovich Petrov began making hunting rifles at a small armory in Zaręka. Later, he set up shop in Yekaterinburg, Omsk, Nizhny Novgorod and the Caucasus. He and his sons also sold gunpowder in Izhevsky Zavod. One of his sons, Vasily, later opened his own armory.
- Andrian Nikandrovich Evdokimov was a competitor of the Petrovs. He had the armory on Bazarnaya Street.
- Nikolay Ilyich Berezin built his enterprise on Bazarnaya Street, too. He produced guns. He also owned a small iron foundry in the northeast suburbs.
- Merchants Porsev and Kilin were the owners of two brick factories.

There were twelve private industrial enterprises in Izhevsky Zavod by 1914.

=== Izhevsky Zavod merchants ===
In the 1870s, trade blossomed in Izhevsky Zavod. The Bodalev Brothers, Mokletsov, Ogloblin, Sveshnikov and Sozykin were the most successful merchants. It was profitable to deal in spirits. There were three vodka distilleries, four wine warehouses, three wine cellars, and about fifty taverns in 1872. This year Ivan Bodalev opened his brewery on the bank of the reservoir.

=== Religious buildings ===
At the turn of the 19th century, there were four temples in Izhevsky Zavod. St. Michael's Cathedral was built between 1897 and 1915.

Izhevsky Zavod was one of the residence centers of the Udmurt Jews, who spoke Udmurtish Yiddish. In the workmen's settlement since 1849 under the Jewish religious needs the house of worship was allocated. A second prayer house was opened in 1917. Both synagogues were closed in 1930 by the Soviet authorities.

=== The Russian Revolution and the Russian Civil War ===
On March 5, 1917, workers at the plant formed a worker's soviet, which included representatives of the workers, the army and of other citizens. Two days later the factory administration resigned. By mid-September of the same year, Bolsheviks took control of both the council and its influential newspaper. On October 27, 1917, Soviet government was officially announced, with the council officially dissolved soon thereafter.

The former leaders of the council were arrested in June 1918, contributing to an uprising against Bolshevik rule. The struggle for control of the city continued until the arrival of the Red Army, which took Izhevsk on November 7. On April 13, 1919, the city was occupied by units of Admiral Kolchak's White Army, only to fall again, this time decisively, to another assault by the Red Army in June 8 of the same year.

=== The Soviet period ===
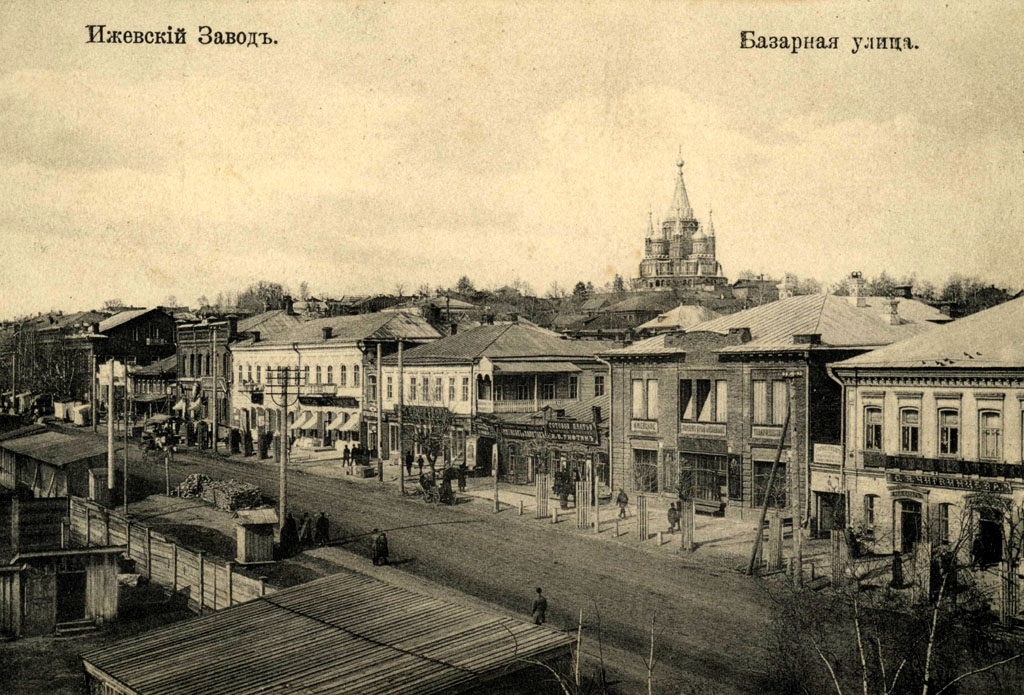
Bazarnaya Street and Saint Michael's Cathedral in 1918

The Soviet period saw significant growth in the size and importance of Izhevsk. In 1921, the city became the administrative center of Votsk Autonomous Oblast, a precursor to the Udmurt Republic. On December 28, 1934, Izhevsk received status of capital of the Udmurt Autonomous Soviet Socialist Republic. The first tramline was opened in 1935. It was 5 km long.

On March 14, 1937, the Republic's constitution was adopted. It consolidated the capital status of Izhevsk. In the autumn of 1941 several defense-related plants evacuated to Izhevsk. In June, 1943, Izhevsk Mechanical Plant was founded. During World War II, Izhevsk plants produced 12 and a half million small arms.

World War II had a profound effect on the city; much of the industrial infrastructure evacuated from the western regions of the Soviet Union was relocated to the city. Elements of the evacuated enterprises were used to create the Izhevsk Mechanical Plant, which remains an important manufacturer of military components.

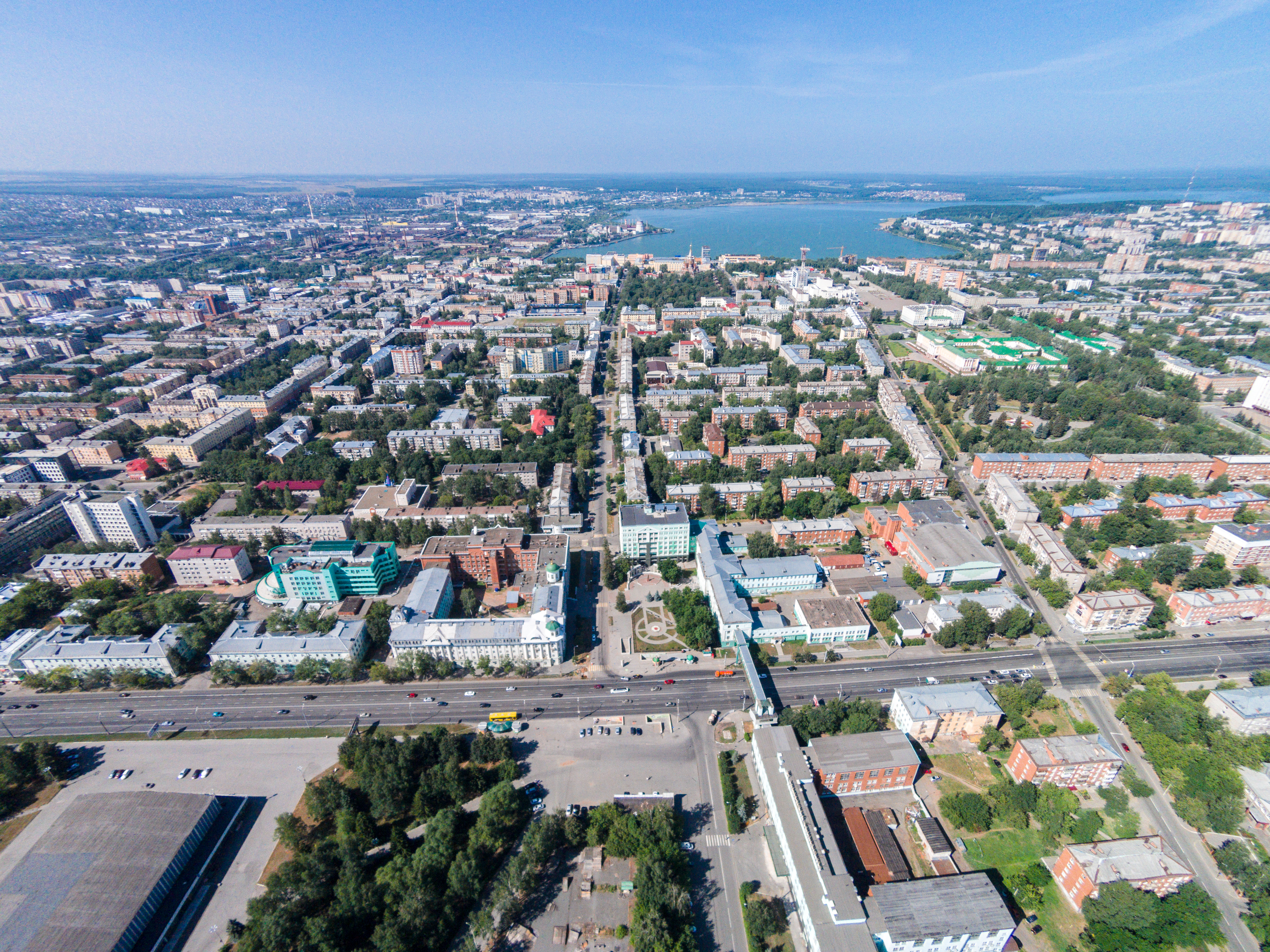
Izhevsk in 2016

Military industry remained the core of the local economy after the war, so Izhvesk was designated a closed city, inaccessible to foreigners. The city's Izhmash factory began manufacturing the AK-47 automatic rifle in 1948, and continues to produce modern variants of the design to this day. The rifle's designer, Mikhail Kalashnikov lived in Izhevsk until his death in 2013. In 1966, Izhmash began manufacturing the Izh brand of automobiles.

In 1984, the city was renamed Ustinov; in honor of former minister of defense Dmitry Ustinov. Three years later, after vocal protests by a significant number of citizens, Izhevsk regained its historical name.

In the 1990s two memorials were erected, on the powder depot and in the Northern cemetery, in memory of a few who were shot during the Great Terror.

Izhevsk weathered the post-Soviet years reasonably well, carried through by the continued demand for its military products. The city remains an important industrial and military center of the country, referred to as the "Armory of Russia", a title it shares with the city of Tula.

=== 2022 school shooting ===
On 26 September 2022, Artyom Kazantsev committed a mass shooting at School No. 88 in the city. Eighteen people, including eleven children, were killed, and 24 others were injured. The school has about 1,000 pupils. Kazantsev later killed himself at the scene.

== Administrative and municipal status ==
Izhevsk is the capital of the republic. Within the framework of administrative divisions, it is incorporated as the city of republic significance of Izhevsk—an administrative unit with the status equal to that of the districts. As a municipal division, the city of republic significance of Izhevsk is incorporated as Izhevsk Urban Okrug.

== Demographics ==
Historical population
Year	Pop.	±%
1897	41,000	—
1926	63,087	+53.9%
1939	175,567	+178.3%
1959	285,294	+62.5%
1970	422,409	+48.1%
1979	548,721	+29.9%
1989	635,109	+15.7%
2002	632,140	−0.5%
2010	627,734	−0.7%
2021	623,472	−0.7%
Source: Census data

Population: 623,472 (2021 census); 627,734 (2010 census); 632,140 (2002 census); 635,109 (1989 Soviet census).

According to the 2010 census, the capital of Udmurtia is home to more than 100 ethnicities. More than two-thirds of residents are Russians (68.8%). Other groups include Udmurts (14.8%), Tatars (8.9%), Ukrainians, Belarusians, Mari, Bashkirs, Chuvash, Armenians, Jews and Germans.

Izhevsk was one of the homes of the Udmurt Jews. Jews have lived in Izhevsk since the 1830s.

== Economy ==
Izhevsk is the most important economic center of the Udmurt Republic, with the majority of financial and industrial activity concentrated in the city. Military industry remains the backbone of the local economy, with a number of enterprises operating in the city. By far the most important of these is Izhmash, which produces small arms and assault rifles popular both in Russia and abroad. The plant also produces motorcycles and automobiles under IZH brandname.

In 2006, Venezuelan President Hugo Chávez visited Izhevsk to tour the Izhmash manufacturing center where he announced his government's intention to purchase a large number of Izhevsk-produced rifles.

== Transport ==
City public transport included buses, trolleybuses and trams. The main railway station is located in the southern part of the city, and the Izhevsk Airport is located east of the city.

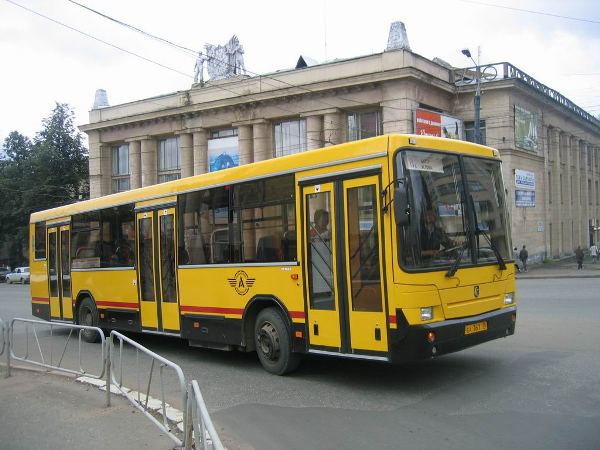
NefAZ-5299 bus

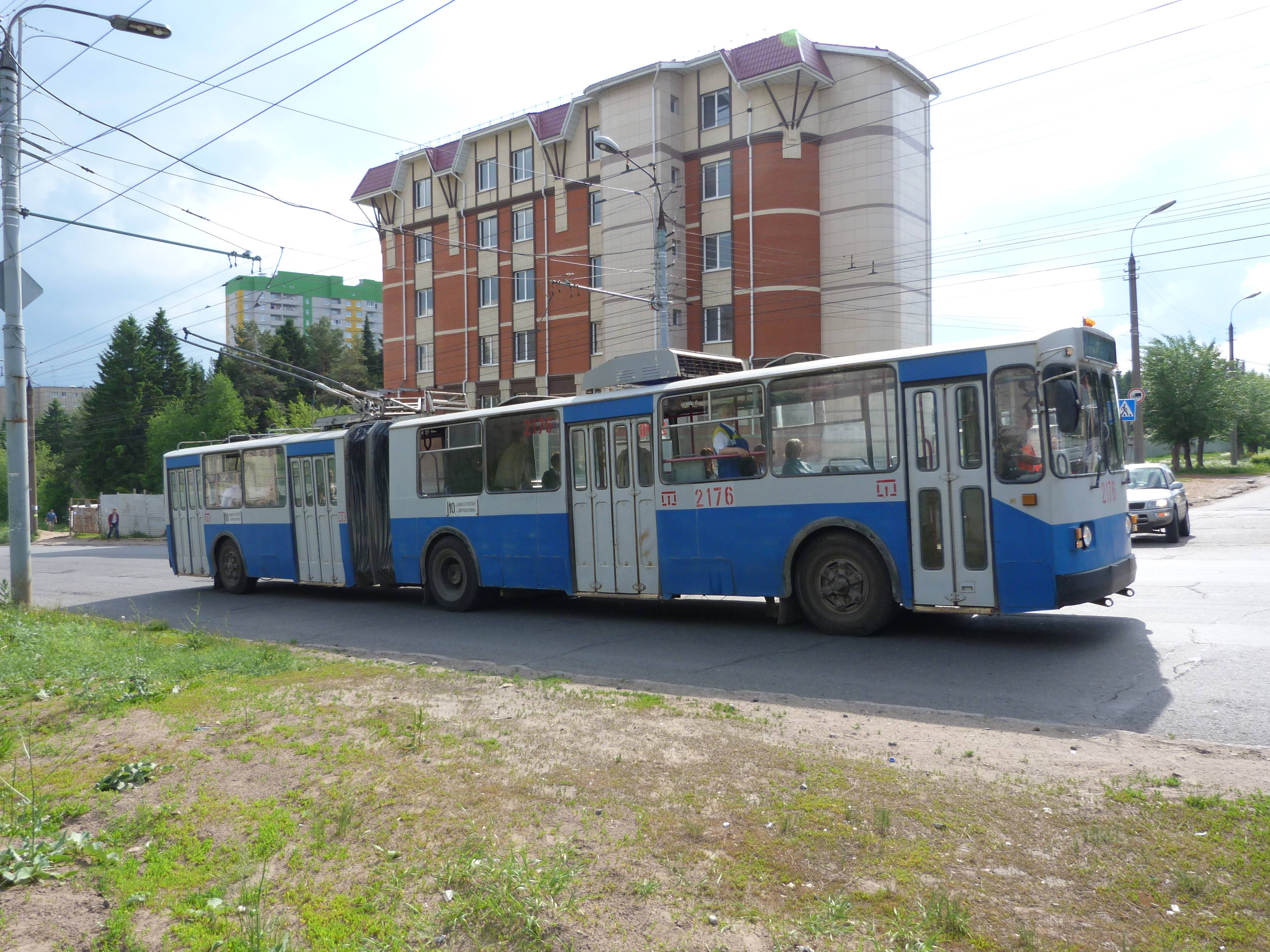
Trolleybus

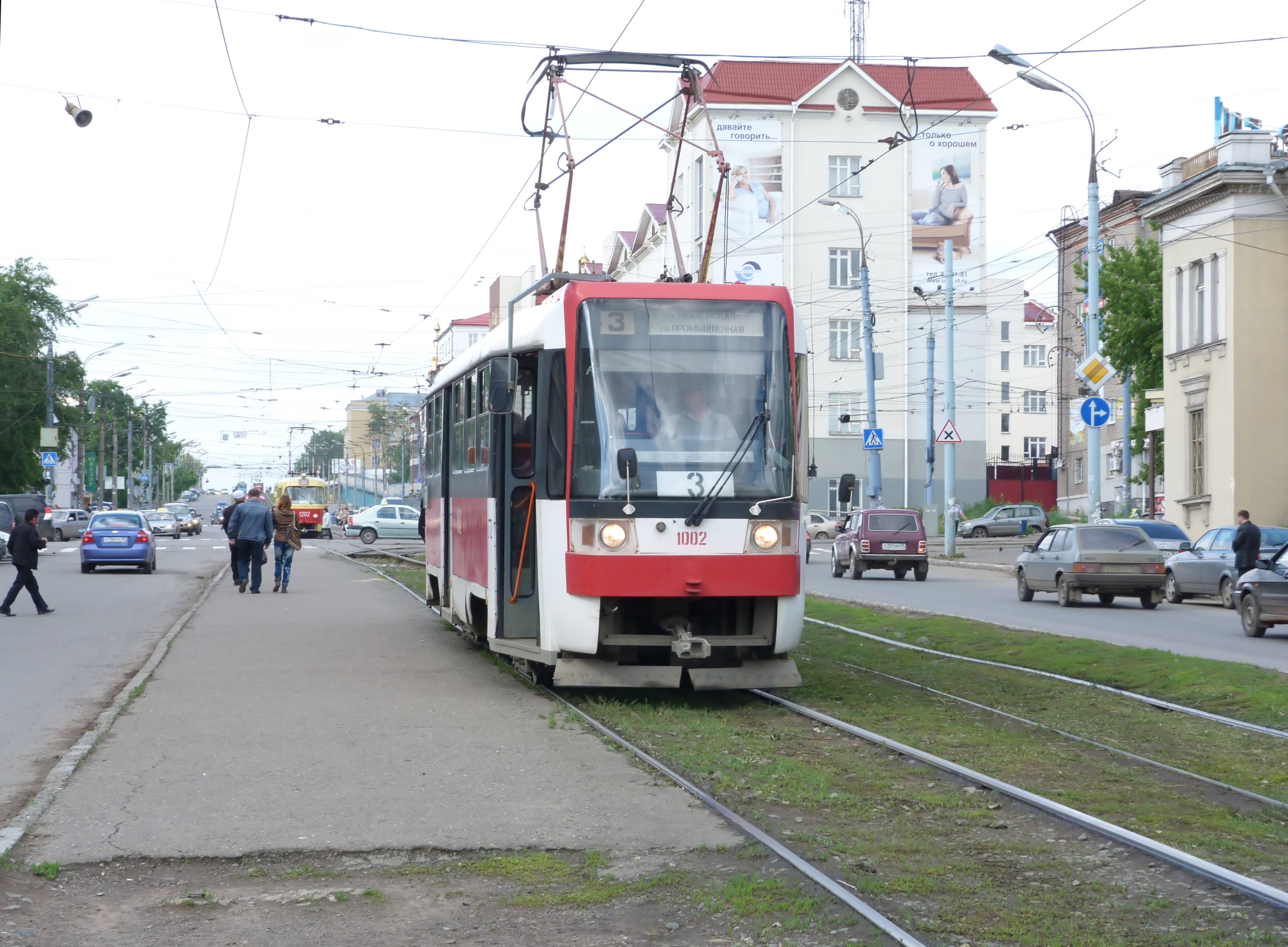
Tatra T3RF tram

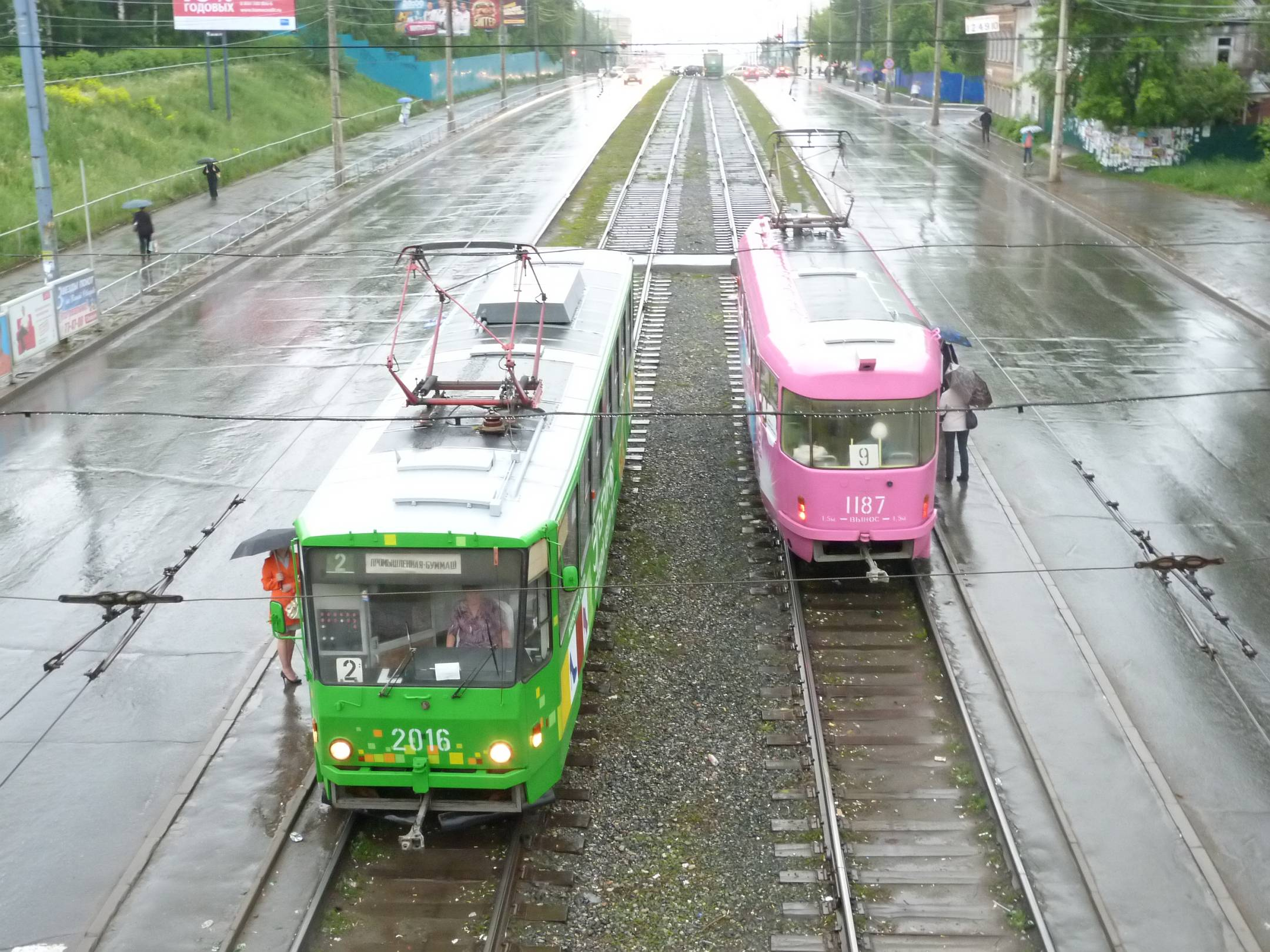
Trams on Central square

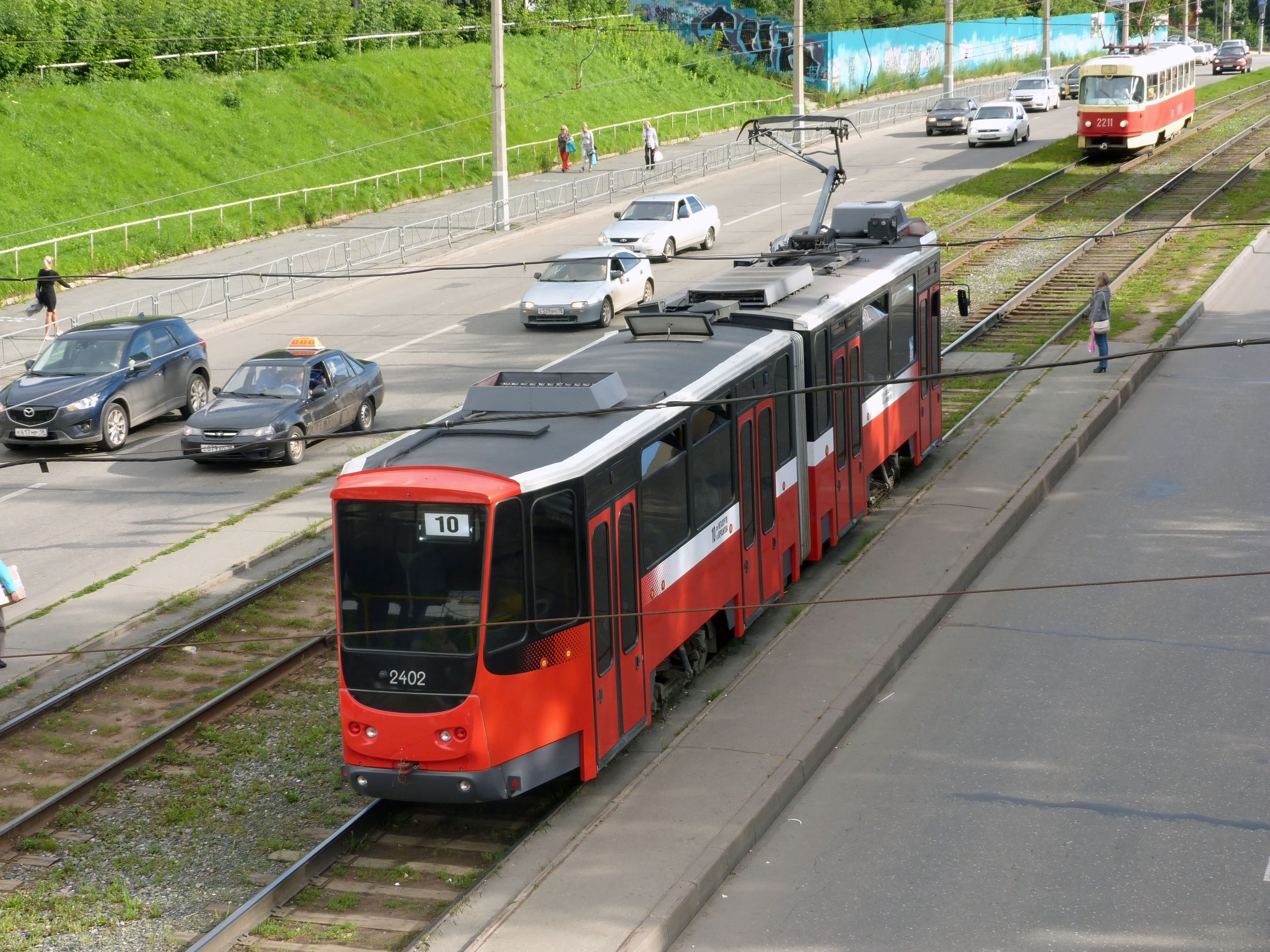
Tatra KT4DM tram

== Climate ==
Izhevsk has a humid continental climate (Köppen climate classification Dfb) with long, cold winters and short, warm summers. Summers are quite a bit warmer than at corresponding latitudes in Western Europe, courtesy of the city's far inland location. Winters are a lot colder than said areas, also due to the distance from the North Atlantic, which results in limited temperature moderation. Even so, winters are a lot less severe than those in Russian cities east of the Ural Mountains.

An extreme July temperature of +37.0 °C (98.6 °F) was recorded during the 2010 Northern Hemisphere summer heat waves, although the highest temperature recorded is +38.1 °C (100.6 °F) in August 2021.

Climate data for Izhevsk (1991–2020 normals, extremes 1933–present)
Month	Jan	Feb	Mar	Apr	May	Jun	Jul	Aug	Sep	Oct	Nov	Dec	Year
Record high °C (°F)	5.4 (41.7)	5.8 (42.4)	14.4 (57.9)	29.2 (84.6)	33.4 (92.1)	35.8 (96.4)	37.0 (98.6)	38.1 (100.6)	33.0 (91.4)	24.1 (75.4)	12.7 (54.9)	4.5 (40.1)	38.1 (100.6)
Mean daily maximum °C (°F)	−8.8 (16.2)	−7.4 (18.7)	−0.5 (31.1)	9.2 (48.6)	18.9 (66.0)	22.9 (73.2)	25.0 (77.0)	22.1 (71.8)	15.8 (60.4)	7.1 (44.8)	−1.8 (28.8)	−7.4 (18.7)	7.9 (46.2)
Daily mean °C (°F)	−12.1 (10.2)	−11.3 (11.7)	−4.6 (23.7)	4.0 (39.2)	12.3 (54.1)	16.8 (62.2)	18.8 (65.8)	16.2 (61.2)	10.6 (51.1)	3.7 (38.7)	−4.4 (24.1)	−10.2 (13.6)	3.3 (37.9)
Mean daily minimum °C (°F)	−15.5 (4.1)	−14.9 (5.2)	−8.4 (16.9)	−0.3 (31.5)	6.4 (43.5)	11.2 (52.2)	13.3 (55.9)	11.4 (52.5)	6.5 (43.7)	0.8 (33.4)	−6.9 (19.6)	−13.3 (8.1)	−0.8 (30.6)
Record low °C (°F)	−46.8 (−52.2)	−40.4 (−40.7)	−32.1 (−25.8)	−23.9 (−11.0)	−11.2 (11.8)	−2.4 (27.7)	4.0 (39.2)	−1.7 (28.9)	−8.5 (16.7)	−21.3 (−6.3)	−33.5 (−28.3)	−47.5 (−53.5)	−47.5 (−53.5)
Average precipitation mm (inches)	32 (1.3)	26 (1.0)	29 (1.1)	29 (1.1)	45 (1.8)	63 (2.5)	66 (2.6)	63 (2.5)	48 (1.9)	53 (2.1)	41 (1.6)	35 (1.4)	530 (20.9)
Average extreme snow depth cm (inches)	46 (18)	59 (23)	62 (24)	21 (8.3)	0 (0)	0 (0)	0 (0)	0 (0)	0 (0)	1 (0.4)	9 (3.5)	27 (11)	62 (24)
Average rainy days	4	3	5	12	18	18	16	18	19	18	9	6	146
Average snowy days	27	23	18	7	2	0.1	0	0	1	11	23	27	139
Average relative humidity (%)	84	80	76	69	61	68	71	74	78	82	85	84	76
Mean monthly sunshine hours	44	85	148	201	282	298	292	246	143	73	41	28	1,881
Source 1: Погода и Климат
Source 2: NOAA (sun, 1961–1990)

== Life and culture ==
=== Education ===
Izhevsk is the scientific and cultural center of the Udmurt Republic. Early on, the state took a leading role in childcare and education. 320 Public kindergartens/ preschools provide affordable childcare for 32,000 children. 100 public schools provide free general education to over 100,000 Izhevsk students. A wide variety of technical colleges and two-year professional schools award associate degrees, most notably in medical assistance, performing arts and teaching.

The Ural department of the Russian Scientific Academy is represented in Izhevsk by several institutions, specializing in physics, applied mechanics and technical sciences, and economics, and the Institute of History, Language and Literature of Udmurtia does the same.

Four out of five higher education institutes in the Udmurt Republic are located in Izhevsk: Udmurt State University, Izhevsk State Technical University, Agricultural Academy, and Izhevsk State Medical Academy. Each of these educational institutions admits foreign students.

Udmurt State University celebrated its 75th anniversary in 2006. It is the oldest educational institution in the Udmurt Republic. Some 28,000 students are currently studying at the university, which offers 86 different majors. The university has thirteen departments and seven institutes. Out of 1,000 faculty members 130 hold Doctor of Science (Dr.Sc.) degrees, and 460 are Candidates of Sciences (Cand.Sc., equivalent to first year of Ph.D.). UdSU graduate school offers 11 attestation committees qualified to award Cand.Sc. and Dr.Sc. degrees in ecology, economics, law, psychology, pedagogics, ethnology, history, culture, linguistics of the Ural region, and Udmurt linguistics.

Izhevsk is a pilot city of the Council of Europe and European Commission Intercultural cities programme.

=== Museums and galleries ===
There are about fifty museums and galleries in Izhevsk. The most popular of them are:

- The Kalashnikov Museum and Exhibition Complex of Small Arms;
- The Gerd National Museum — the Arsenal;
- The Udmurt Republican Museum of Fine Arts;
- The Izhmash Museum;
- The Museum of Medicine and Pharmacy;
- The Museum of Electrification and Electroenergetics;
- The Gennadiy Krasilnikov Memorial Flat;
- The National Center of Decorative and Applied Arts and Handicraft;
- The Galerea Exhibition Center.

The Kalashnikov Museum and Exhibition Complex of Small Arms, or the Kalashnikov Museum, opened in 2004. Its expositions tell about Izhevsk as one of the most important centers of Russian arms production. The main person of the museum narration is Mikhail Kalashnikov. The museum and exhibition complex holds the permanent exposition devoted to this legendary Russian armourer. There are temporary expositions in addition to the permanent exposition launched in 2004. The Museum has a demonstration hall, including the shooting gallery where different models of historical and contemporary arms are presented, and the pneumatic shooting gallery.

17 kilometers from Izhevsk is the Ludorvay Architectural and Ethnographic Open-air Museum. It was founded in 1990 on the premises of the former Russian settlement Ilyinka. Total area of the culture preserve is about 40 hectares. It divided into five exhibition parts: the Sector of Central Udmurts, the Sector of Southern Udmurts, Russian sector, the Windmill, and the Mushtor Apiary Complex.

=== Theaters and philharmonics ===
Izhevsk has a number of theaters, among the most prominent of which are:

- State Russian Drama Theatre;
- State National Theatre of the Udmurt Republic;
- State Opera and Ballet Theatre of the Udmurt Republic;
- State Puppet Theatre of the Udmurt Republic;
- Modern Dramaturgy and Direction Centre;
- "Young Man" Municipal Theatre;
- "Ptitsa" Theatre-Studio;
- State Philharmonic of the Udmurt Republic.

=== Circus ===
One of the integral parts of Izhevsk cultural life is the State Circus of the Udmurt Republic. Residents of Izhevsk have liked circus throughout the history of the city. In olden days the settlement was visited by vagrant performers — skomorokhs with mountain bears, strongmen and fakirs. Since the turn of the 19th century, shows took places in booths — temporary structures with benches for the rich and standing room for the poor.

The first Izhevsk circus was built by Aleksandr Koromyslov in 1895. It had existed until the Civil War began. On 21 September 1926, the Kolart Circus was opened. It was made of wood and seated 1,500 spectators.

In 1943, at the height of The Great Patriotic War, the stone circus building was erected in the Kolart's place. It was designed by P.M. Popov after the pattern of Ciniselli Circus in Saint Petersburg. On 29 November 1943, wounded soldiers saw the first show there. The Circus seated 1,800 spectators and was considered one of the best in the Soviet Union.

On January 14, 1990, the Circus was closed because of dilapidation. On 29 December 1999, the building was razed.

On January 17, 2000, a cornerstone of new circus was laid. The project was designed by Moscow architect Mikhail Vesnin. In the judgment of specialists, the contemporary building of the Circus is one of the best in Russia. It seats 1,800 spectators like the predecessor and has current technologies and high-performance audio and light equipment.

The International Circus Art Festival has been held at the State Circus of the Udmurt Republic yearly in March since 2008. Circus stars come to Izhevsk from every corner of the globe. Some of the world's leading circus art festivals and circus managers and producers join the festival jury.

=== Sports ===
The Izhevsk ice hockey team HC Izhstal plays in the Supreme Hockey League. In the season 2013-14 the team finished the regular season 19th and failed to qualify for the playoffs.

The football club Zenit-Izhevsk plays in the Russian Professional Football League. In the season 2013-14 the team finished fifth in the zone Ural-Povolzhye.

The women's handball team Universitet plays in Russian Superleague.

The sledge hockey team Udmurtia was twice champion of Russia (2010, 2014).

=== Entertainment ===
In the post-Soviet period, Izhevsk became known as home to a vibrant art and music scene. Izhevsk is sometimes referred to as "the capital of Russian electronic music". The most well-known Izhevsk electronic act was Стук Бамбука в XI Часов (Stuk Bambuka v XI Chasov), whose only album Лёгкое дело холод (1991) is now considered classic.

== Cityscape ==
=== Notable buildings and structures ===
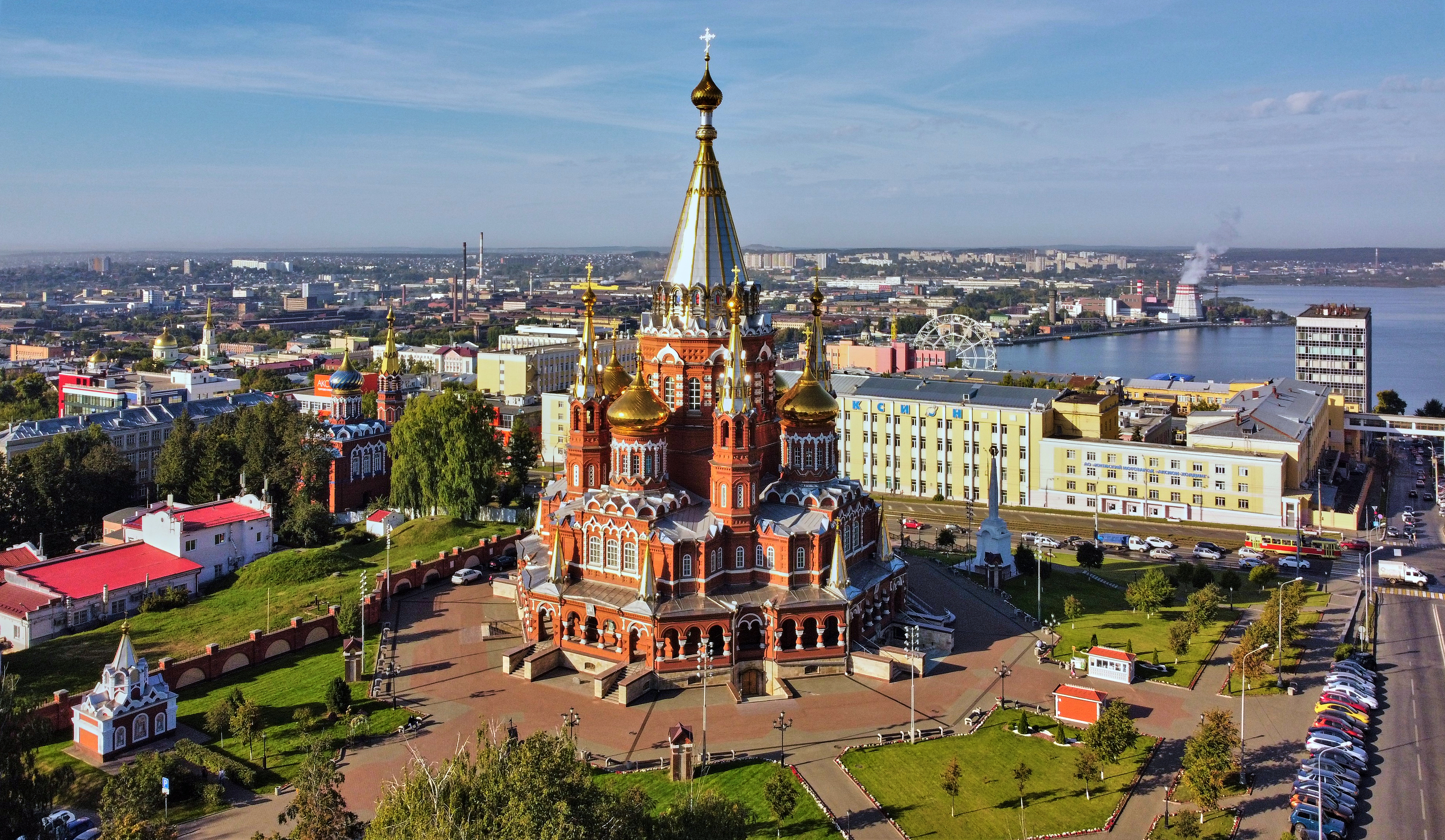
St. Michael's Cathedral

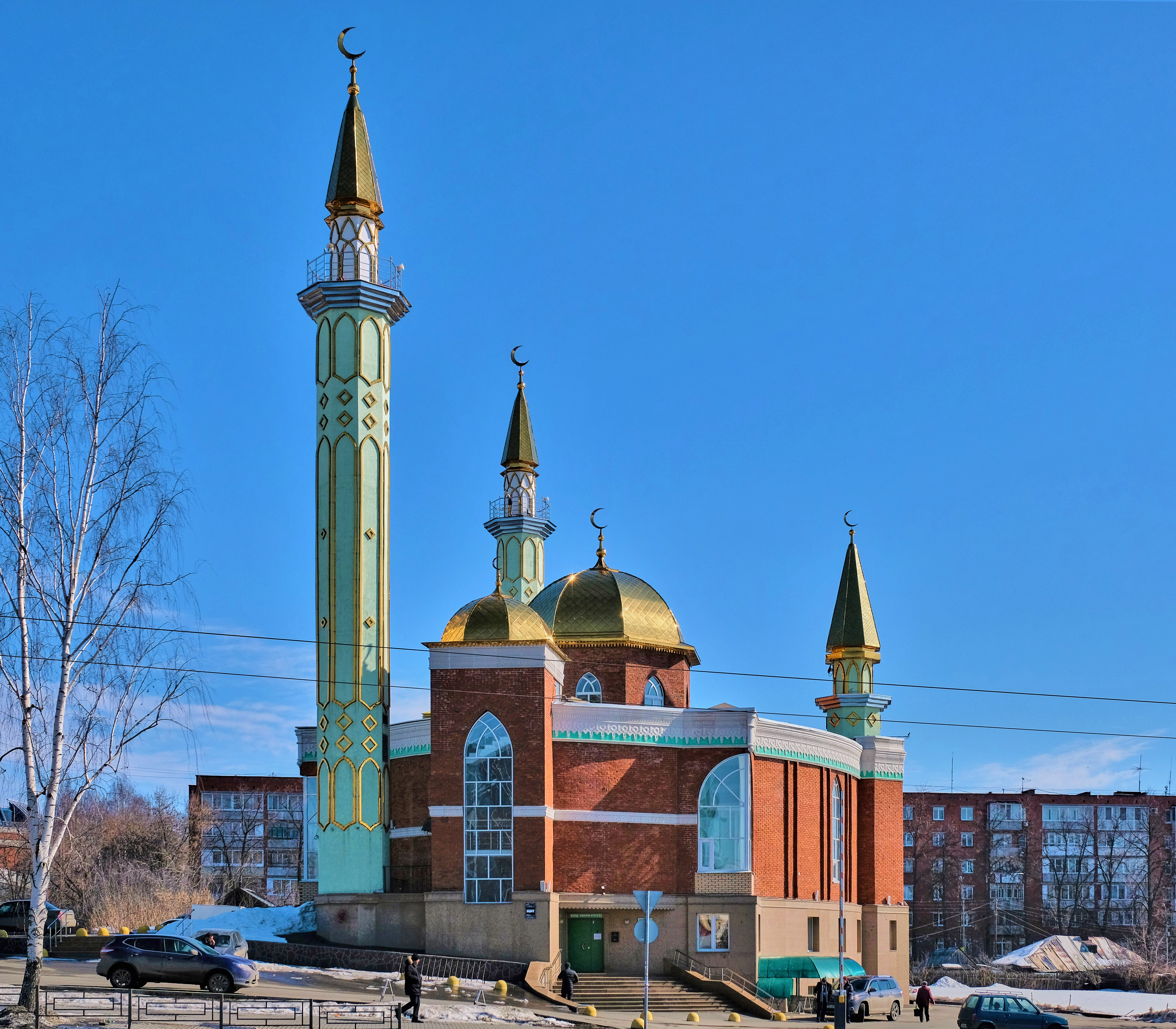
Mosque in Izhevsk

- Alexander Nevsky Cathedral is a Neoclassical building from 1823 patterned after St. Andrew's Cathedral in Kronstadt (whose architect was Andreyan Zakharov)
- St. Michael's Cathedral was built by the Izhevsk arms works in the early 20th century, destroyed by the Bolsheviks and rebuilt to the original design in 2007
- Pesochnaya TV Mast (195-m tall guyed tubular steel mast built in 1962, which is equipped with six crossbars running in two levels from the mast structure to the guys)

=== Pond ===
Izhvesk City Pond's area is over 22 km^{2}, yet it was artificially constructed (in parts dug by hand) in the 1760s for industrial needs. Empress Elizabeth of Russia granted Count Peter Shuvalov official permission to create three factories in the Kama River region September 15, 1757.

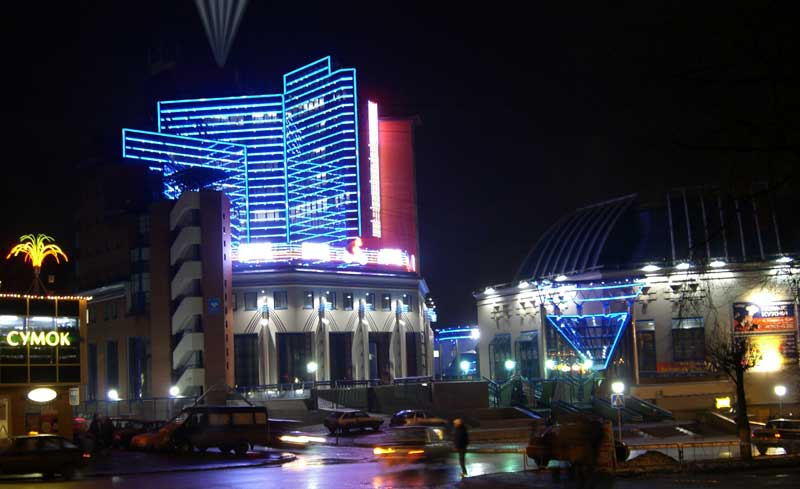
Udmurtia Republic Circus

Construction of the three-step industrial dam at the critical point where the two rivers (Izh and Yagul/Podborenka) join started both the pond and the city in April 1760.

The dam was reconstructed in 1809–1815 when Andrey Fedorovich Deryabin converted the original metalworking factory into the new arms producing facility. It was subsequently modernized again in 1983–1984 in order to extend the dam. Today a number of major Izhevsk industrial plants are still located along the pond.

In 1972, the Izhevsk Pond Embankment, a three-mile-long walkway and a system of boulevards and squares, was extended along the pond. The "Friendship of Nations" Square, with its central monument celebrating 400 years of Udmurtia's union with Russia, is a focal point of the esplanade and a hip place for youth recreation. During the summer months excursion boats operate from Izhevsk to the village of Volozhka.

== International relations ==
Izhevsk is a pilot city of the Council of Europe.

=== Twin towns – sister cities ===
Izhevsk is twinned with:

- Brest, Belarus
- Córdoba, Argentina
- Maracay, Venezuela
- Salt Lake City, United States
- Tatabánya, Hungary
- Wuhan, China
- Xining, China
- Yambol, Bulgaria

It was twinned with Będzin, Poland, until the 2022 Russian invasion of Ukraine, for which Będzin cut ties.

== Notable people ==
=== Science and technology ===
- Yevgeny Dragunov (1920–1991), firearm designer
- Victor Kalashnikov (1942–2018), weapons scientist and engineer, son of Mikhail Kalashnikov
- Vladimir Napolskikh (born 1963), ethnographer and linguist
- Gennadiy Nikonov (1950–2003), firearm designer
- Taisiya Osintseva (1923–2008), neurologist and physician

=== Sport ===
- Alina Zagitova (born 2002), figure skater, European, World and Olympic champion
- Dmitri Bykov (born 1977), ice hockey defenceman
- Andrei Kirilenko (born 1981), basketball player, European champion
- Galina Kulakova (born 1942), cross-country skier, four-time Olympic champion
- Maxim Maksimov (born 1979), biathlete
- Valeriy Medvedtsev (born 1964), biathlete
- Vladimir Semakov (born 1985), Russian and Ukrainian biathlete, European champion
- Vladimir Shkurikhin (born 1958), volleyball player, world and European champion
- Ivan Tcherezov (born 1980), biathlete, world champion
- Tamara Tikhonova (born 1964), cross-country skier, two-time World and a two-time Olympic champion
- Pavel Tonkov (born 1969), racing cyclist
- Fedor Tyutin (born 1983), ice hockey defenceman, world champion
- Anna Zhigalova (born 1981), sumo wrestler
- Andrei Vedernikov (born 1959), cyclist, world champion

=== Others ===
- Alexander Saburov (1908–1974), partisan in World War II, Soviet general and politician
- Volodymyr Selivanov (born 1945), Ukrainian statesman
- Artem Chigvintsev (born 12 June 1982), professional dancer
- Elena Evseeva (born 13 December 1982), ballerina
- Timofey Kulyabin (born 1984), theater and opera director
- Rauf & Faik (born 7 July 1999), pop duet musicians
- Yulia Chirkova (born 1 September 1996), glamour model and pornographic actress, better known by her professional name Jia Lissa.

== Gallery ==
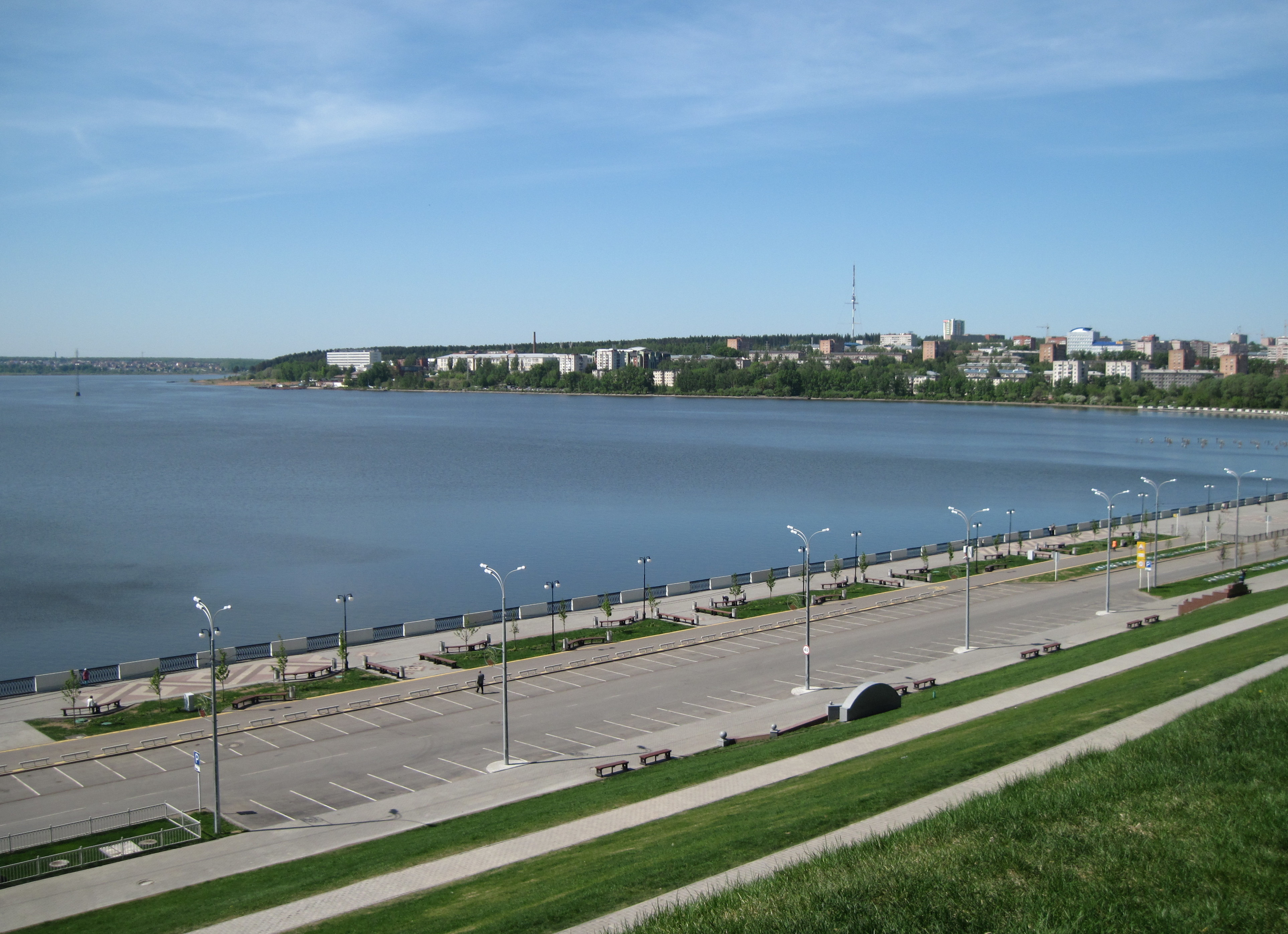
Izhevsk

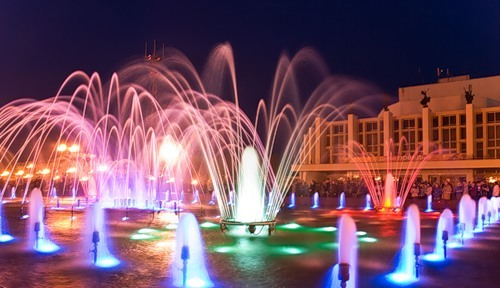
Izhevsk

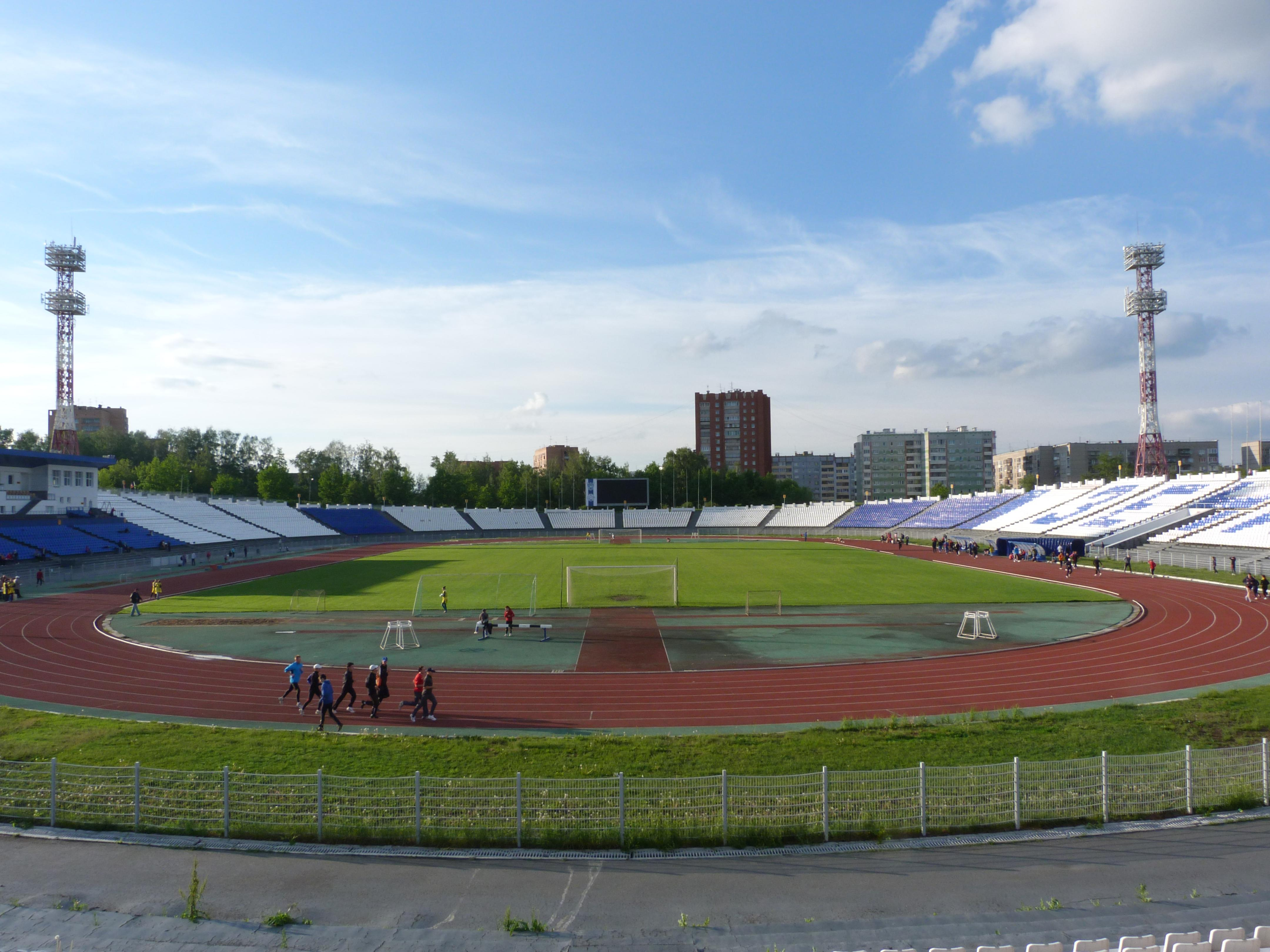
FC Zenit-Izhevsk Stadium

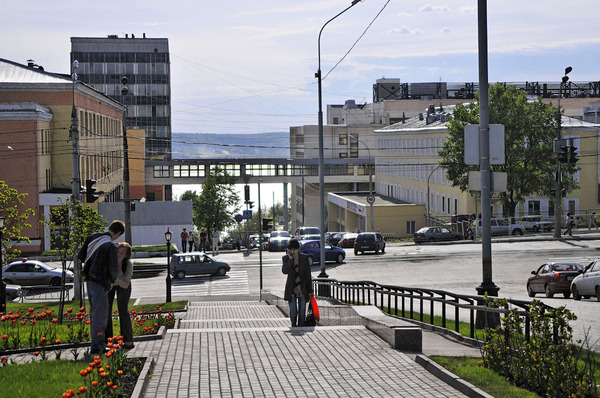
Izhevsk, Russia

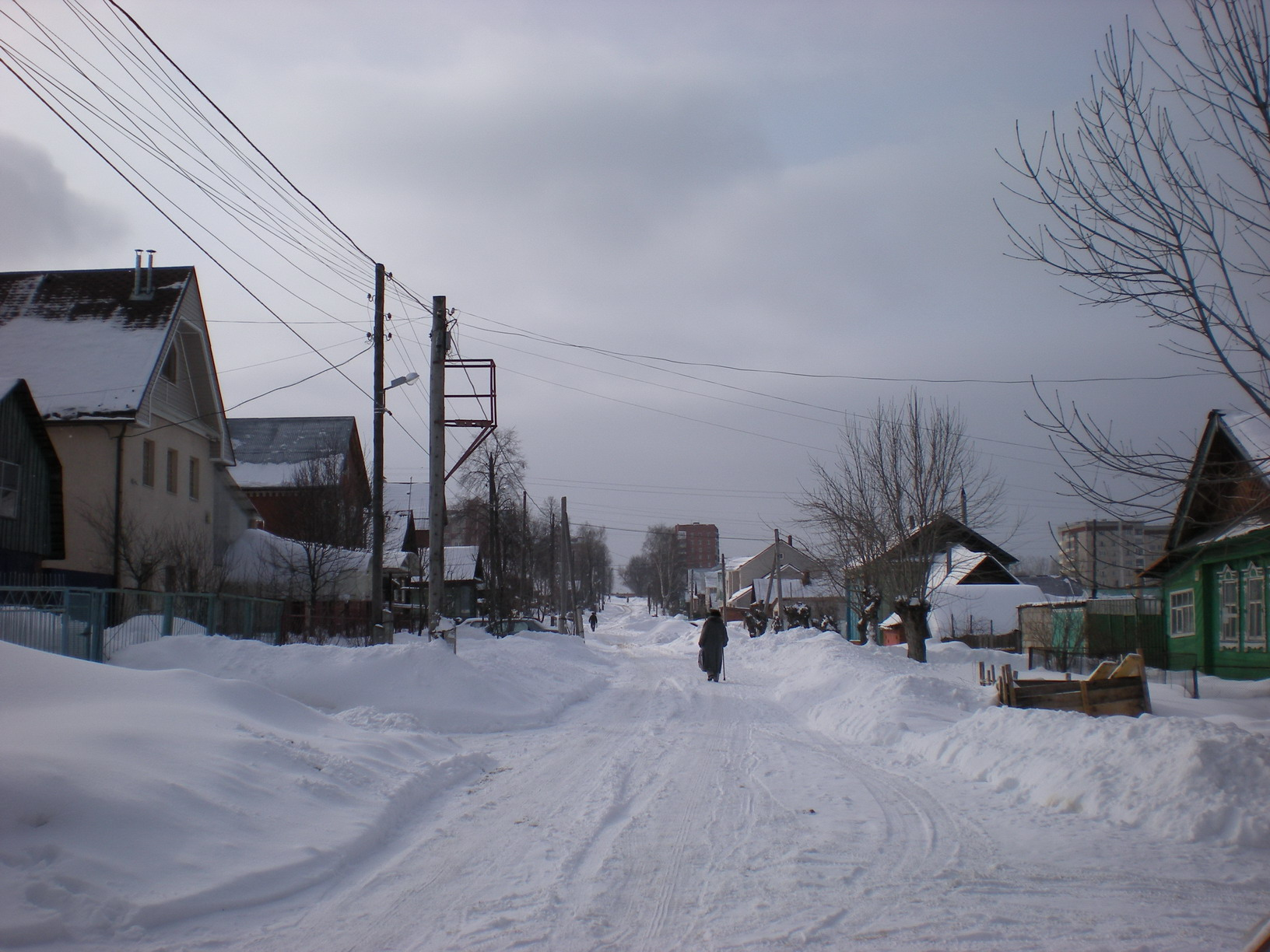
Ippodromaya street, Izhevsk

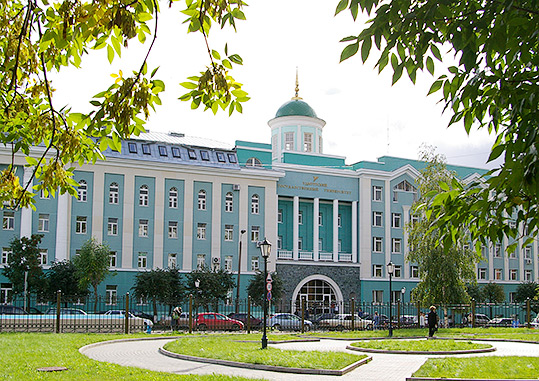
Udmurt State University, Izhevsk

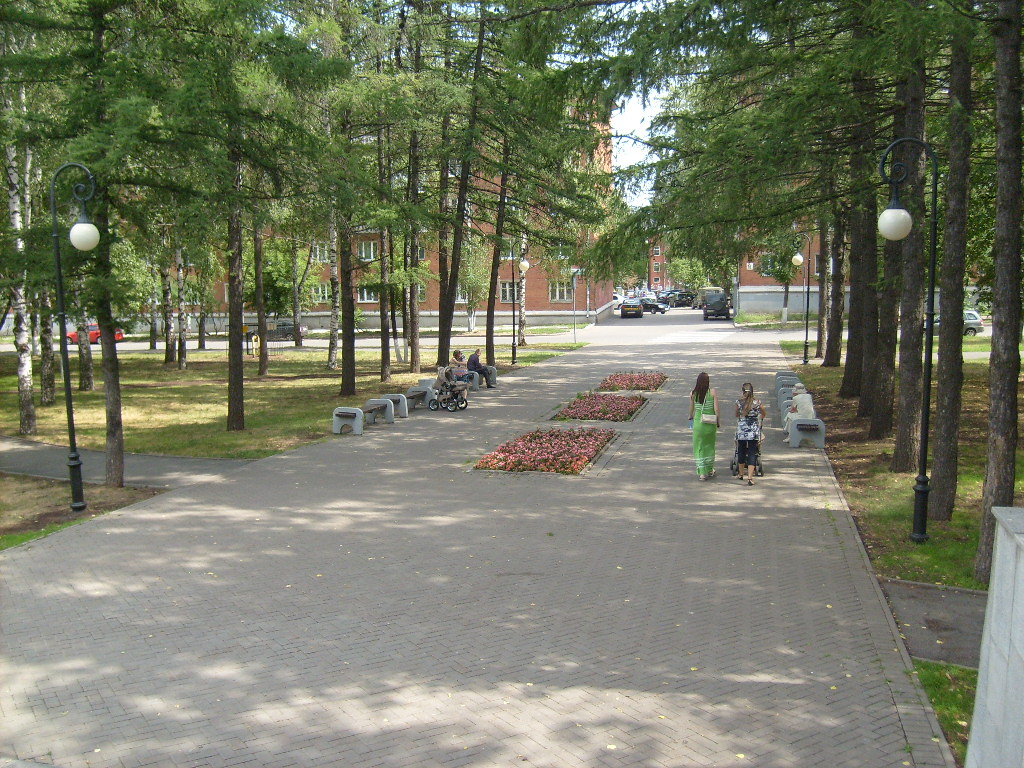
Karlutskaya square, Izhevsk

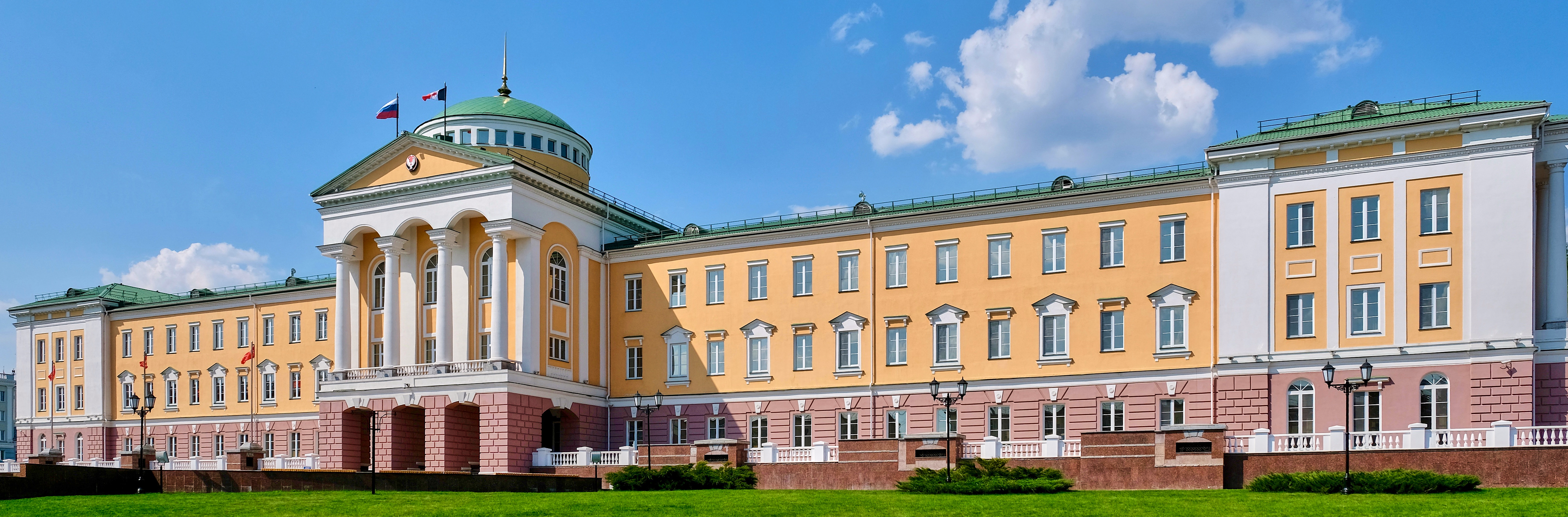
Presidential palace
