= Privolzhsky constituency =

Constituency of the State Duma of the Russian Federation

Privolzhsky single-member constituency
- Constituency of the Russian State Duma
- Deputy: Ilia Volfson; United Russia
- Federal subject: Republic of Tatarstan
- Districts: Baltasinsky, Kazan (Privolzhsky, Vakhitovsky), Kukmorsky, Laishevsky, Mamadyshsky, Pestrechinsky, Rybno-Slobodsky, Sabinsky, Tyulyachinsky
- Voters: 494,320 (2026)

The Privolzhsky constituency (No.31 (Note: No.27 in 1993-1995, 2003-2007, No.26 in 1995–2003 and 2016–2026)) is a Russian legislative constituency in Tatarstan. The constituency covers north-central Tatarstan, stretching from central and southern Kazan eastwards to Mamadysh.

The constituency has been represented since 2021 by United Russia deputy Ilia Volfson, a construction businessman, who won the open seat after defeating three-term United Russia incumbent Fatikh Sibagatullin in the primary.

== Boundaries ==
1993–1995: Kazan (Leninsky, Privolzhsky, Sovetsky, Vakhitovsky)
The constituency was based entirely in Kazan and covered most of the city, including its central, southern and eastern districts.

1995–2007: Kazan (Novo-Savinovsky, Privolzhsky, Sovetsky, Vakhitovsky)
The constituency was slightly changed after the 1995 redistricting, as Leninsky city district of Kazan was divided between Aviastroitelny and Novo-Savinovsky districts in 1994: Privolzhsky constituency retained only Novo-Savinovsky, while Aviastroitelny was placed into Moskovsky constituency. Privolzhsky constituency also gained former Baumansky city district, which was merged into Vakhitovsky in 1994, from the Moskovsky constituency.

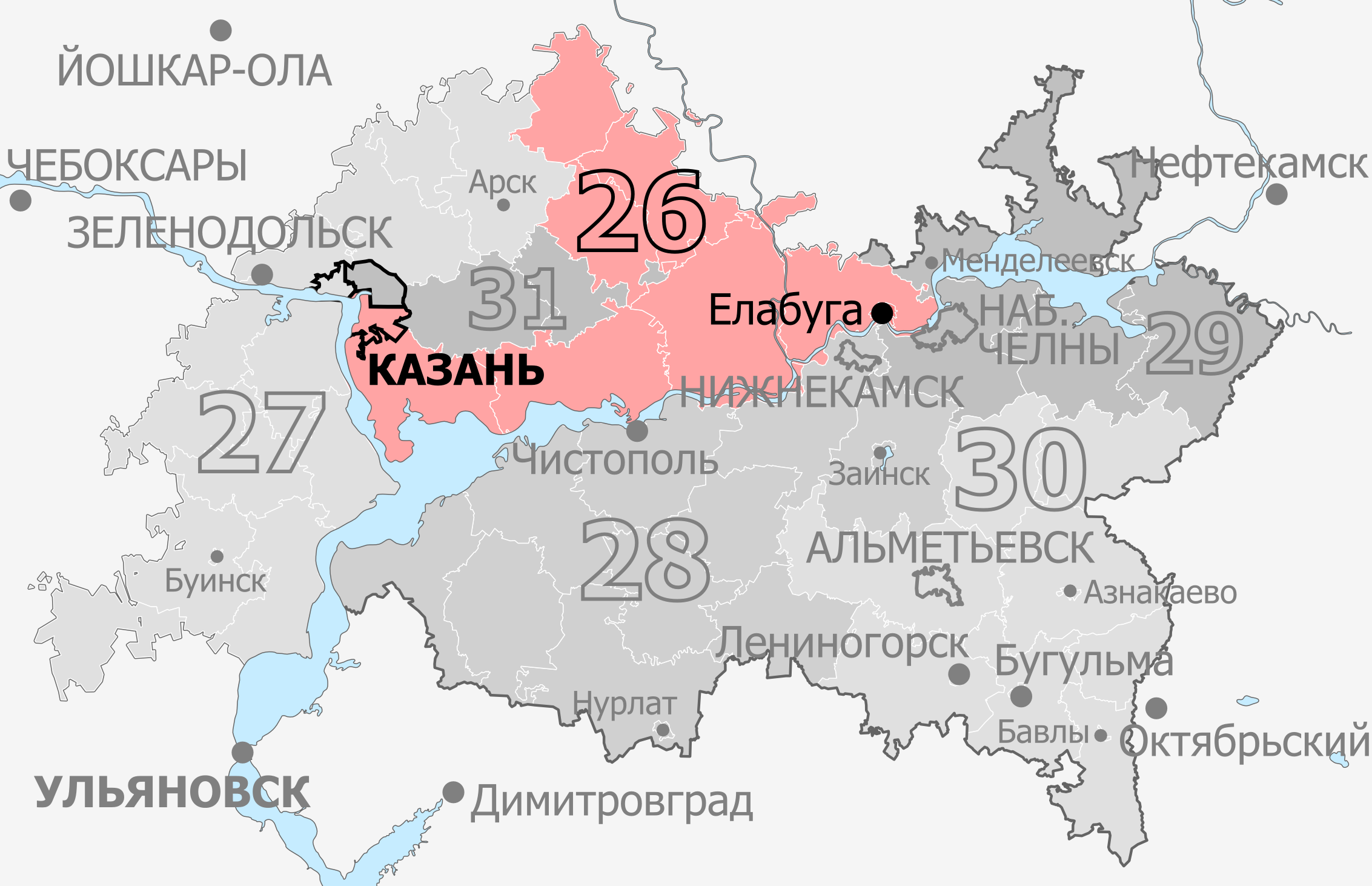
Constituency boundaries from 2016 to 2026

2016–2026: Baltasinsky District, Kazan (Privolzhsky, Vakhitovsky), Kukmorsky District, Laishevsky District, Mamadyshsky District, Rybno-Slobodsky District, Sabinsky District, Yelabuzhsky District
The constituency was re-created for the 2016 election. This seat retained only Privolzhsky and Vakhitovsky city districts of Kazan, losing the rest to new Central constituency. The constituency gained rural north-central Tatarstan, stretching along the Kama river to Yelabuga as well from the former Nizhnekamsk constituency.

2026–present: Baltasinsky District, Kazan (Privolzhsky, Vakhitovsky), Kukmorsky District, Laishevsky District, Mamadyshsky District, Pestrechinsky District, Rybno-Slobodsky District, Sabinsky District, Tyulyachinsky District
After the 2025 redistricting the constituency was slightly altered, losing Yelabuzhsky District to Nizhnekamsk constituency and gaining Pestrechinsky and Tyulyachinsky districts from Central constituency.

== Members elected ==
| Election | Member | Party |
|---|---|---|
| 1993 | Results were invalidated due to low turnout | |
| 1994 | Valentin Mikhaylov | Independent |
| 1995 | Sergey Shashurin | Independent |
| 1999 | Sergey Shashurin | Russian All-People's Union |
| 2003 | Airat Khairullin | United Russia |
| 2007 | Proportional representation - no election by constituency | |
| 2011 | Proportional representation - no election by constituency | |
| 2016 | Fatikh Sibagatullin | United Russia |
| 2021 | Ilia Volfson | United Russia |
| 2026 | Ilia Volfson | United Russia |

== Election results ==
=== 1993 ===
Election results were invalidated due to low turnout (23.16%). A by-election was scheduled for March 1994.

==== Declared candidates ====
- Rashid Akhunov (Independent), businessman, writer
- Mikhail Glukhov (Independent), leader of Oprichny Dvor (1993–present), Baptist pastor
- Valery Kurnosov (Independent), journalist
- Valentin Mikhaylov (Choice of Russia), Member of Supreme Council of Tatarstan (1990–present)
- Andrey Morozov (Independent), journalist
- Kamil Shaidarov (Independent), banker
- Sergey Sitko (DPR), designer at Kazan Aircraft Production Association

==== Results ====
Summary of the 12 December 1993 Russian legislative election in the Privolzhsky constituency
| Candidate | Party | Votes | % |
|---|---|---|---|
| Rashid Akhunov | Independent | – | – |
| Mikhail Glukhov | Independent | – | – |
| Valery Kurnosov | Independent | – | – |
| Valentin Mikhaylov | Choice of Russia | – | – |
| Andrey Morozov | Independent | – | – |
| Kamil Shaidarov | Independent | – | – |
| Sergey Sitko | Democratic Party | – | – |
| Total | | 133,395 | 100% |

=== 1994 ===
==== Declared candidates ====
- Rais Belyayev (Independent), former Member of Supreme Soviet of the Russian SFSR (1975–1985), former First Secretary of the CPSU Naberezhnye Chelny City Committee (1970–1984)
- Valentin Mikhaylov (Independent), Member of Supreme Council of Tatarstan (1990–present), 1993 candidate for this seat

==== Results ====
Summary of the 13 March 1994 by-election in the Privolzhsky constituency
| Candidate | Party | Votes | % |
|---|---|---|---|
| Valentin Mikhaylov | Independent | – | 23.9% |
| Rais Belyayev | Independent | – | 21.9% |

=== 1995 ===
==== Declared candidates ====
- Albert Abdullin (Interethnic Union), Member of State Council of the Republic of Tatarstan (1995–present), Head of Kazan Privolzhsky City District
- Mufasir Akhunov (People's Union), chemical process engineer
- Boris Isayev (V–N!), former People's Deputy of Russia (1990–1993), former Deputy Chairman of the Supreme Soviet of the Russian SFSR (1990–1991)
- Mikhail Kotovsky (Independent), head of the Kazan Suvorov Military School (1990–present), Russian Army major general
- Valentin Mikhaylov (DVR–OD), incumbent Member of State Duma (1994–present)
- Irek Murtazin (Independent), journalist
- Nikolay Rybushkin (BN), consumer services executive
- Aleksandr Saliy (CPRF), first secretary of the party regional committee, retired Russian Army podpolkovnik
- Viktor Sedinin (LDPR), deputy coordinator of the party regional office
- Sergey Shashurin (Independent), Member of State Council of the Republic of Tatarstan (1995–present), businessman
- Ivan Stogniyev (Independent), Military Commissioner of Tatarstan (1989–present), Russian Army major general

==== Results ====
Summary of the 17 December 1995 Russian legislative election in the Privolzhsky constituency
| Candidate | Party | Votes | % |
|---|---|---|---|
| Sergey Shashurin | Independent | 63,804 | 24.47% |
| Aleksandr Saliy | Communist Party | 46,557 | 17.85% |
| Valentin Mikhaylov (incumbent) | Democratic Choice of Russia – United Democrats | 45,519 | 17.46% |
| Irek Murtazin | Independent | 18,463 | 7.08% |
| Albert Abdullin | Interethnic Union | 13,730 | 5.27% |
| Mikhail Kotovsky | Independent | 10,515 | 4.03% |
| Boris Isayev | Power to the People | 10,353 | 3.97% |
| Nikolay Rybushkin | Bloc of Independents | 6,039 | 2.32% |
| Viktor Sedinin | Liberal Democratic Party | 4,862 | 1.86% |
| Ivan Stogniyev | Independent | 4,103 | 1.57% |
| Mufasir Akhunov | People's Union | 3,419 | 1.31% |
| against all | | 22,309 | 8.55% |
| Total | | 260,776 | 100% |

=== 1999 ===
==== Declared candidates ====
- Rashit Akhmetov (Yabloko), journalist
- Dmitry Berdnikov (Independent), nonprofit chairman, community activist
- Valentin Mikhaylov (Independent), former Member of State Duma (1994–1995)
- Rafael Mingazov (OVR), former Minister of Finance of the Tatar ASSR (1988–1990), banker
- Aleksandr Saliy (CPRF), Member of State Duma (1996–present), 1995 candidate for this seat
- Aleksandr Sapogovsky (Independent), Member of State Council of the Republic of Tatarstan (1995–present), businessman
- Sergey Shashurin (ROS), incumbent Member of State Duma (1996–present)
- Insaf Saifullin (NDR), Member of State Duma (1996–present)
- Andrey Tatyanchikov (SPS), businessman

==== Failed to qualify ====
- Valery Gumilevsky (DN), director of the Modern University for the Humanities, Kazan branch
- Farit Khabibullin (KTR–zSS), artistic director of the Kazan Theatre of Young Spectators
- Sergey Molnin (Independent), former Member of Kazan City Council of People's Deputies (1990–1995), animals' rights activist
- Ildar Raimanov (RSP), businessman
- Yevgeny Shcherbina (RPP), businessman

==== Results ====
Summary of the 19 December 1999 Russian legislative election in the Privolzhsky constituency
| Candidate | Party | Votes | % |
|---|---|---|---|
| Sergey Shashurin (incumbent) | Russian All-People's Union | 69,693 | 21.08% |
| Aleksandr Sapogovsky | Independent | 43,202 | 13.07% |
| Dmitry Berdnikov | Independent | 38,206 | 11.56% |
| Aleksandr Saliy | Communist Party | 32,176 | 9.73% |
| Rafael Mingazov | Fatherland – All Russia | 27,489 | 8.32% |
| Insaf Saifullin | Our Home – Russia | 20,640 | 6.24% |
| Rashit Akhmetov | Yabloko | 15,569 | 4.71% |
| Valentin Mikhaylov | Independent | 14,904 | 4.51% |
| Andrey Tatyanchikov | Union of Right Forces | 13,727 | 4.15% |
| against all | | 37,474 | 11.34% |
| Total | | 330,538 | 100% |

=== 2003 ===
==== Declared candidates ====
- Shamil Amirov (Independent), aide to Moscow City Duma member Yevgeny Bunimovich
- Rais Atnagulov (Independent), nonprofit president
- Aleksandr Grachyov (Independent), insurance agent
- Ivan Grachyov (RP), Member of State Duma (1994–present), chairman of the Development of Enterprise party (1998–present), 2001 presidential candidate
- Airat Khairullin (United Russia), Member of State Council of the Republic of Tatarstan (1999–present), agriculture businessman
- Sergey Khapugin (Independent), law firm director
- Irek Murtazin (Yabloko), former press secretary to the President of Tatarstan (1999–2002), journalist, 1995 candidate for this seat
- Aleksandr Saliy (CPRF), Member of State Duma (1996–present), 1995 and 1999 candidate for this seat
- Aleksandr Sapogovsky (Independent), Member of State Council of the Republic of Tatarstan (1995–present), businessman, 1999 candidate for this seat
- Vitaly Shashurin (Independent), serviceman
- Andrey Spirin (LDPR), manager

==== Withdrawn candidates ====
- Ramazan Khafizov (Independent), businessman
- Sergey Shashurin (NPRF), incumbent Member of State Duma (1996–present), 2001 presidential candidate
- Aleksandr Shtanin (SPS), Member of State Council of the Republic of Tatarstan (2000–present)

==== Did not file ====
- Dmitry Berdnikov (Independent), nonprofit chairman, community activist, 1999 candidate for this seat
- Albert Bikmullin (ORP Rus'), private academy president
- Dania Karimova (VR–ES), former Member of State Duma (1996–1999) (ran in the Moskovsky constituency)
- Svetlana Khambir (DPR), journalist
- Fedis Khasanov (Independent), pensioner
- Valery Luzgin (NPPR), philosophy professor
- Natalya Petrova (Independent), journalist
- Anatoly Yevdokimov (Independent), pensioner
- Anuza Zakirova (RPP-PSS), homemaker

==== Results ====
Summary of the 7 December 2003 Russian legislative election in the Privolzhsky constituency
| Candidate | Party | Votes | % |
|---|---|---|---|
| Airat Khairullin | United Russia | 114,503 | 31.00% |
| Ivan Grachyov | Development of Enterprise | 80,857 | 21.89% |
| Aleksandr Sapogovsky | Independent | 35,175 | 9.52% |
| Aleksandr Saliy | Communist Party | 27,088 | 7.33% |
| Aleksandr Grachyov | Independent | 15,509 | 4.20% |
| Irek Murtazin | Yabloko | 15,164 | 4.11% |
| Sergey Khapugin | Independent | 6,174 | 1.67% |
| Vitaly Shashurin | Independent | 5,144 | 1.39% |
| Andrey Spirin | Liberal Democratic Party | 4,846 | 1.31% |
| Rais Atnagulov | Independent | 3,640 | 0.99% |
| Shamil Amirov | Independent | 1,409 | 0.38% |
| against all | | 46,968 | 12.72% |
| Total | | 370,466 | 100% |

=== 2016 ===
==== Declared candidates ====
- Rushania Bilgildeyeva (A Just Russia), Member of Kazan City Duma (2015–present), consumers' rights advocate
- Yevgeny Borodin (Rodina), political strategist
- Lenar Gabdullin (LDPR), Member of Voykino Council (2015–present), art director
- Dmitry Novikov (CPCR), Member of Chistopolskoye Rural Council (2015–present), quantity surveyor
- Ilya Novikov (PARNAS), businessman, perennial candidate
- Viktor Peshkov (CPRF), Member of State Duma (1996–2003, 2011–present)
- Fatikh Sibagatullin (United Russia), Member of State Duma (2007–present)

==== Withdrawn candidates ====
- Irek Murtazin (Yabloko), former press secretary to the President of Tatarstan (1999–2002), journalist, 1995 and 2003 candidate for this seat

==== Failed to qualify ====
- Dmitry Berdnikov (Independent), nonprofit chairman, community activist, 1999 and 2003 candidate for this seat, 2008 presidential candidate
- Lilia Galyautdinova (Independent), information law associate professor
- Sergey Salnikov (Independent), auto repair shop owner

==== Results ====
Summary of the 18 September 2016 Russian legislative election in the Privolzhsky constituency
| Candidate | Party | Votes | % |
|---|---|---|---|
| Fatikh Sibagatullin | United Russia | 248,549 | 70.74% |
| Rushania Bilgildeyeva | A Just Russia | 31,099 | 8.85% |
| Viktor Peshkov | Communist Party | 25,277 | 7.19% |
| Lenar Gabdullin | Liberal Democratic Party | 13,397 | 3.81% |
| Yevgeny Borodin | Rodina | 11,042 | 3.14% |
| Dmitry Novikov | Communists of Russia | 9,960 | 2.83% |
| Ilya Novikov | People's Freedom Party | 8,746 | 2.49% |
| Total | | 351,343 | 100% |

=== 2021 ===
==== Declared candidates ====
- Regina Abdullina (Party of Growth), unemployed
- Marsel Gabdrakhmanov (LDPR), former Member of Kazan City Duma (2014–2015), perennial candidate
- Vitaly Gribov (RPPSS), construction executive
- Damir Khusnutdinov (SR–ZP), businessman
- Irek Murtazin (Yabloko), former press secretary to the President of Tatarstan (1999–2002), journalist, 1995, 2003 and 2016 candidate for this seat
- Vasily Novikov (CPCR), Member of Almetyevsk City Council (2020–present)
- Fadbir Safin (CPRF), Member of State Council of the Republic of Tatarstan (2019–present), tourism professor
- Eduard Shiverskikh (New People), Ministry of Health of Tatarstan official
- Ilia Volfson (United Russia), Member of State Council of the Republic of Tatarstan (2019–present), construction businessman

==== Declined ====
- Fatikh Sibagatullin (United Russia), incumbent Member of State Duma (2007–present) (lost the primary)

==== Results ====
Summary of the 17-19 September 2021 Russian legislative election in the Privolzhsky constituency
| Candidate | Party | Votes | % |
|---|---|---|---|
| Ilia Volfson | United Russia | 232,177 | 62.25% |
| Fadbir Safin | Communist Party | 41,216 | 11.05% |
| Marsel Gabdrakhmanov | Liberal Democratic Party | 20,539 | 5.51% |
| Vasily Novikov | Communists of Russia | 18,168 | 4.87% |
| Damir Khusnutdinov | A Just Russia — For Truth | 16,668 | 4.47% |
| Regina Abdullina | Party of Growth | 13,300 | 3.57% |
| Vitaly Gribov | Party of Pensioners | 10,229 | 2.74% |
| Eduard Shiverskikh | New People | 8,464 | 2.27% |
| Irek Murtazin | Yabloko | 8,354 | 2.24% |
| Total | | 372,998 | 100% |

=== 2026 ===
==== Declared candidates ====
- Dmitry Chirkov (A Just Russia), Member of Nizhniye Yaki Council (2017–present), construction businessman
- Sofya Fyodorova (Yabloko), lawyer
- Dmitry Mulkov (New People), Member of Staroye Tyaberdino Council (2025–present), IT businessman
- Almaz Sabirov (LDPR), lawyer
- Fadbir Safin (CPRF), Member of State Council of the Republic of Tatarstan (2019–present), tourism professor, 2021 candidate for this seat
- Ilia Volfson (United Russia), incumbent Member of State Duma (2021–present)

==== Declined ====
- Rail Shamsutdinov (United Russia), former Member of State Council of the Republic of Tatarstan (2023–2024), college lecturer (lost the primary)

==== Results ====
Summary of the 18-20 September 2026 Russian legislative election in the Privolzhsky constituency
| Candidate | Party | Votes | % |
|---|---|---|---|
| Ilia Volfson (incumbent) | United Russia | 253,294 | 67.50% |
| Fadbir Safin | Communist Party | 43,718 | 11.65% |
| Dmitry Mulkov | New People | 29,249 | 7.79% |
| Almaz Sabirov | Liberal Democratic Party | 24,617 | 6.56% |
| Dmitry Chirkov | A Just Russia | 12,973 | 3.46% |
| Sofya Fyodorova | Yabloko | 8,411 | 2.24% |
| Total | | 375,275 | 100% |
