= Nizhnyaya Kama National Park =

National park of Russia

- Нижняя Кама (Russian)
- IUCN category II (national park)
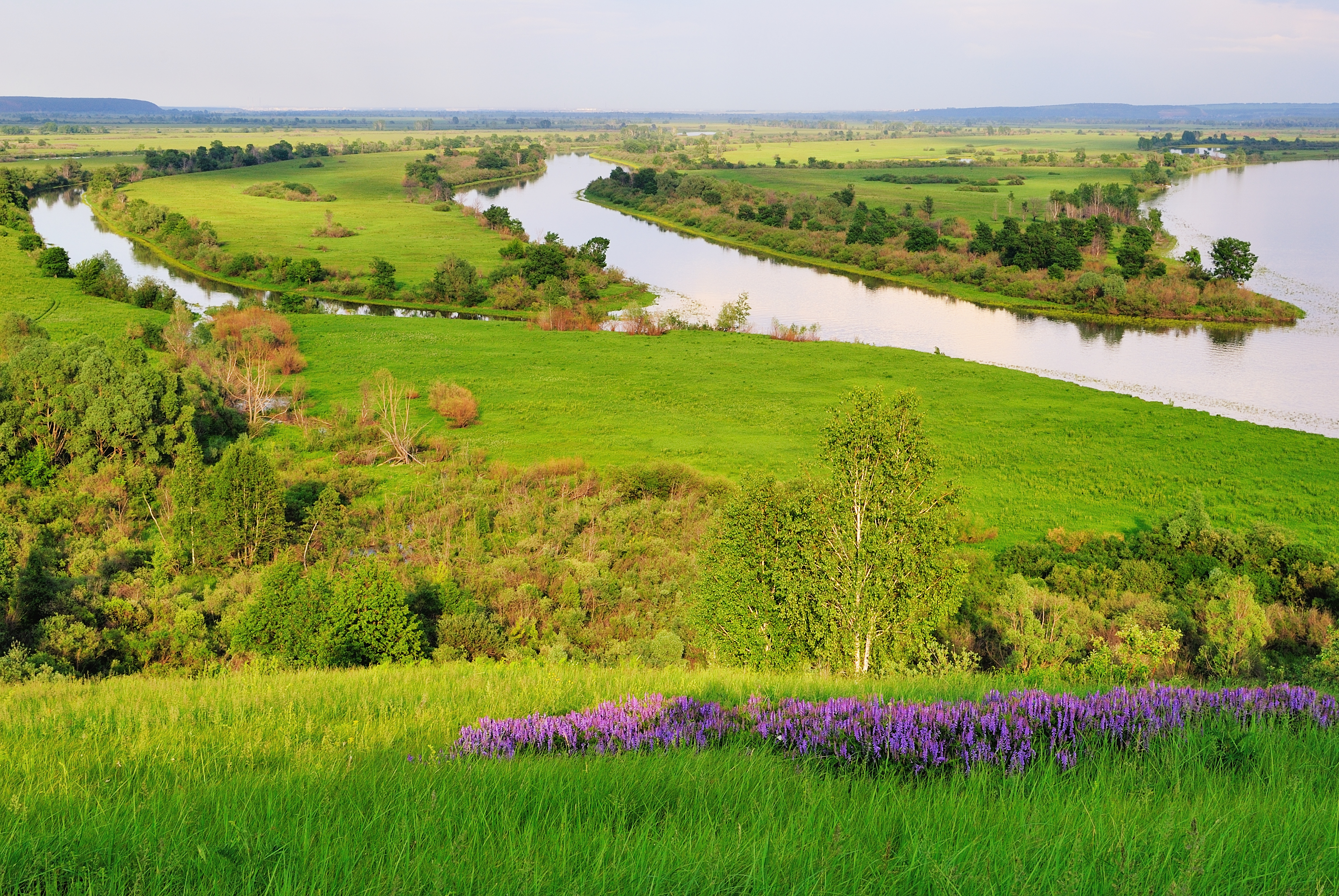
- Tanayevsky meadows. Kama-Kriushskaya floodplain. National Park "Lower Kama"

- Location within Russia
- Location: Russia
- Nearest city: Yelabuga, Naberezhnye Chelny
- Coordinates: 55°48′04″N 52°19′24″E
- Area: 265.87 square kilometres (102.65 mi^{2})
- Established: 1991
- Governing body: Federal Forestry Service
- Website: http://nkama-park.ru/

Nizhnyaya Kama National Park (Russian: Национальный парк Нижняя Кама; Tatar: Түбән Кама милли паркы; in both languages: "Lower Kama National Park") is a national park in the center of Russia, located in Tukayevsky and Yelabuzhsky Districts of Tatarstan. It was established April 20, 1991 to protect coniferous (mostly pine) forests at the banks of the Kama River.

== Location and geography ==
The park consists of three isolated clusters. Two of them - Maly Bor and Tanayavskaya Dacha - are located close to the city of Yelabuga, on the right bank of the Kama, whereas the third one, Bolshoy Bor, is situated on the peninsula on the left bank of the Kama, outside the city of Naberezhnye Chelny. In the limits of the park, the Kama is built as Nizhnekamsk Reservoir. The right bank of the river is high, with ravines. The Toyma River is the biggest tributary of the Kama inside the part. The left bank of the Kama is flat. Below the dam, the Kama meanders, and the meadows on the right bank in this area also belong to the park.

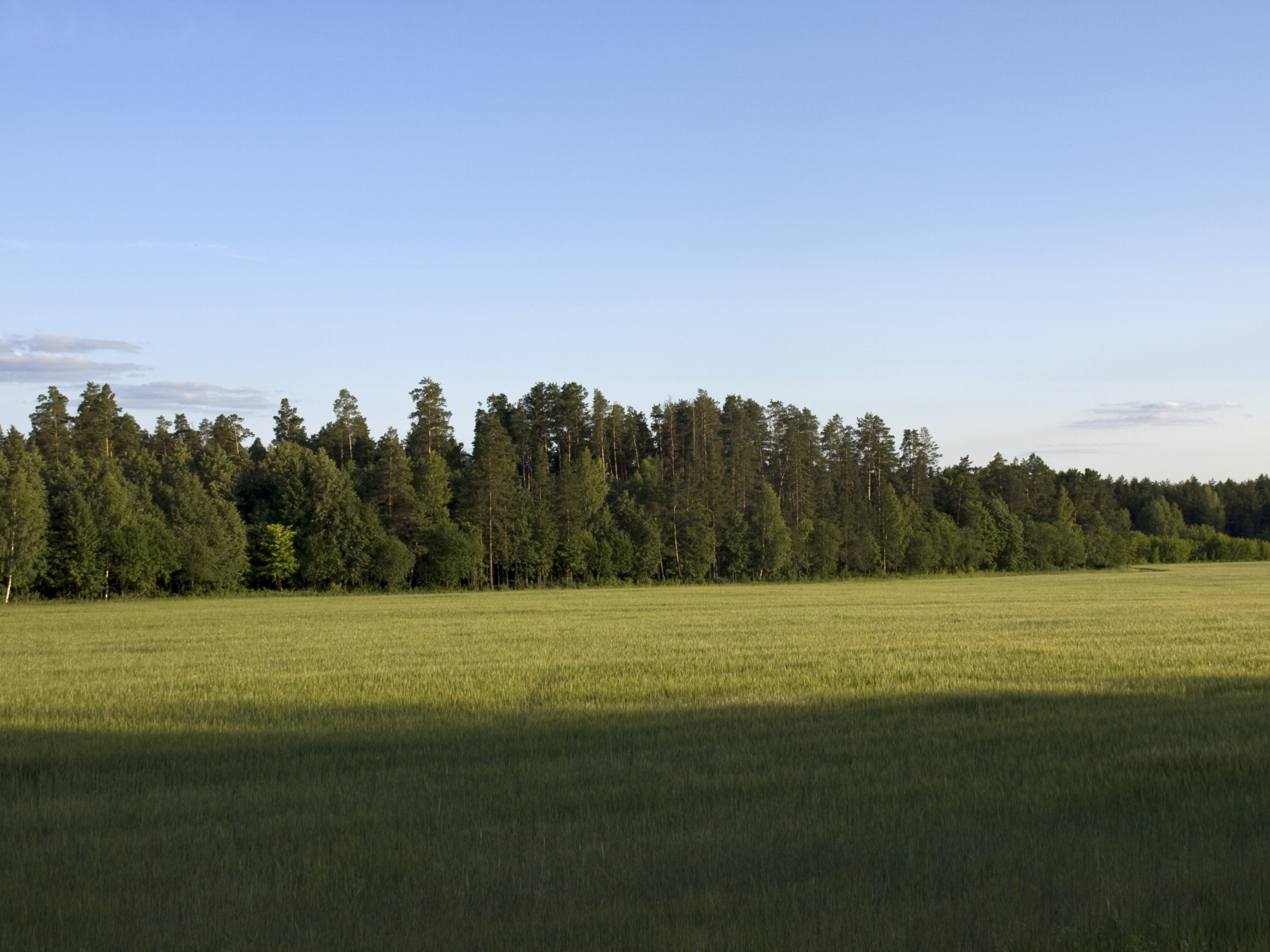
Maly Bor

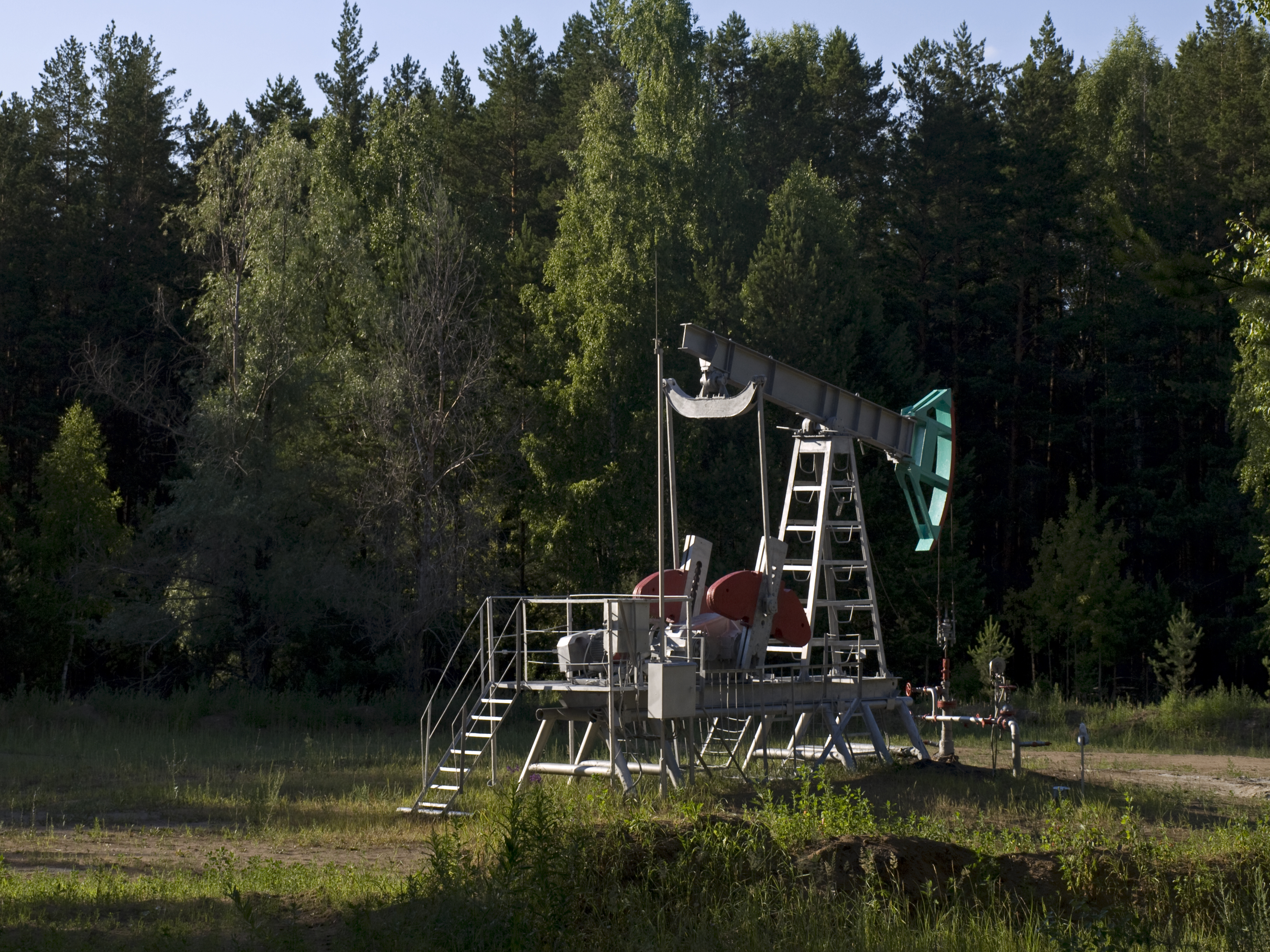
A pumpjack in Nizhnyaya Kama National Park (close to the village of Pospelovo)

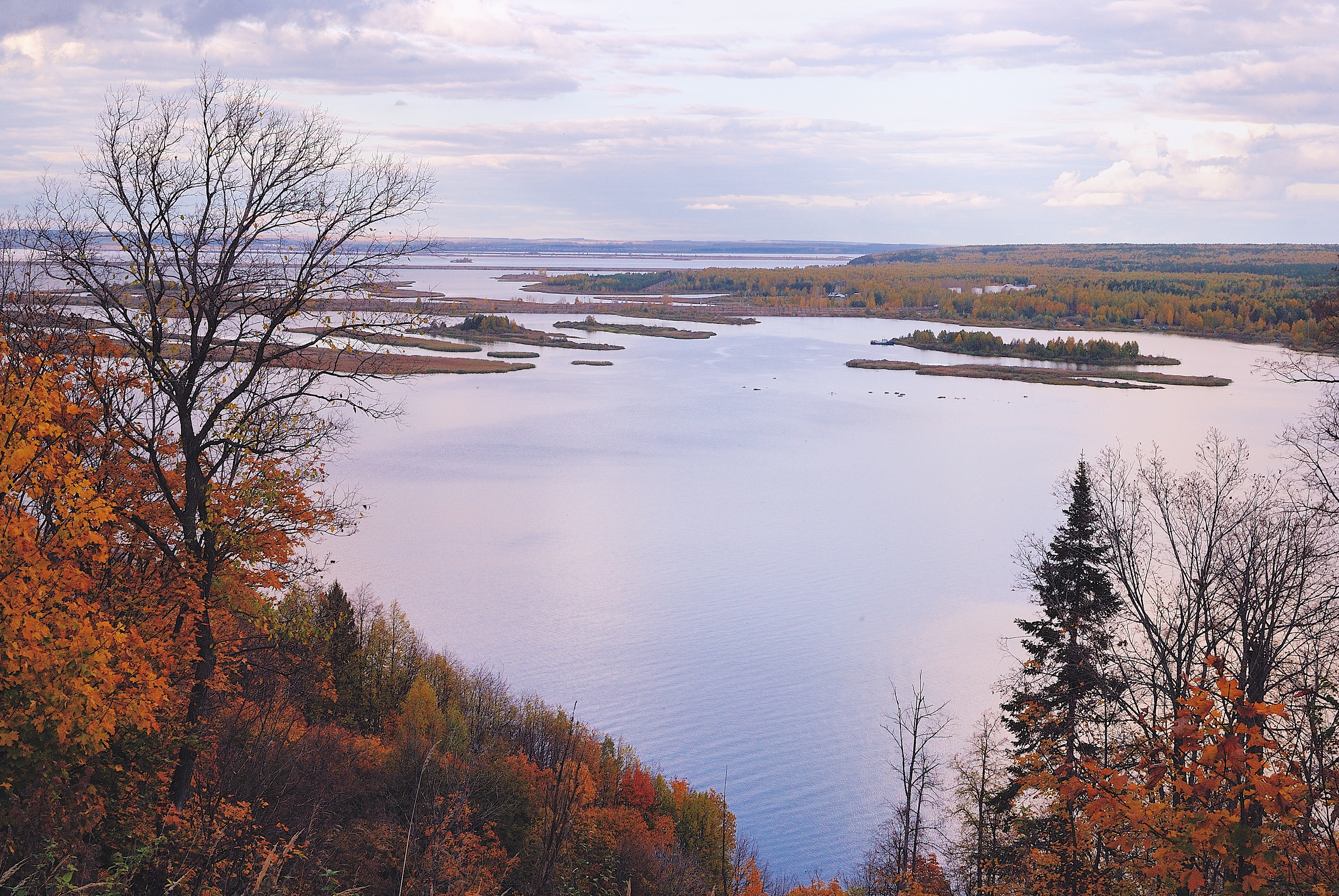
Lower Kama Yelabuga

== Fauna ==
Big mammals widespread in the park include moose, roe deer, boar, lynx, badger, eurasian beaver, and raccoon dog. There are several species of bats, some of which are rare. The park has over 190 species of birds, 6 species of reptiles, 10 species of amphibia, and 16 species of fish.

== Flora ==
The areas adjacent to Nizhnekamsk Reservoir are covered by forest. Forest is also present far from the shore, as isolated clusters. Among the trees, the most common are pine (65.4% of the forest area), birch (19%), and aspen (6%). Some of the forest was planted.
