= Kārlis Hūns =

Baltic German painter (1831–1877)

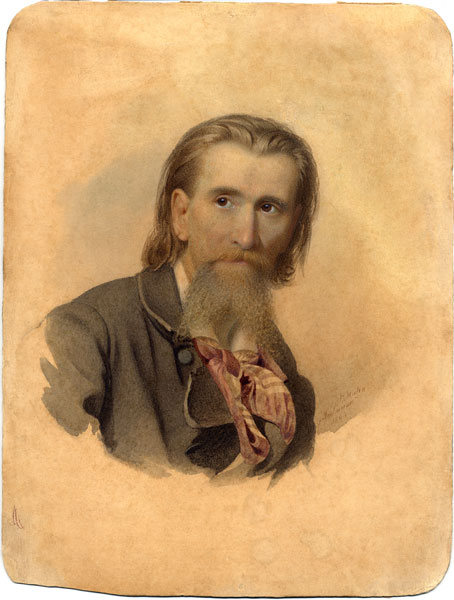
- Self-portrait (1864)
- Born: Kārlis Jēkabs Vilhelms Hūns; 13 November 1831; Madliena Parish, Governorate of Livonia, Russian Empire
- Died: 28 January 1877 (aged 45); Davos, Switzerland
- Education: Member Academy of Arts (1868); Professor by rank (1870)
- Alma mater: Imperial Academy of Arts (1861)
- Known for: Painting
- Style: Academism
- Awards: Big Gold Medal of the Imperial Academy of Arts (1861)

Karl Jacob Wilhelm Huhn (Latvian: Kārlis Jēkabs Vilhelms Hūns, Russian: Карл Фёдорович Гун, romanized: Karl Fyodorovich Gun; 13 November 1831 – 28 January 1877) was a Baltic German history, genre and landscape painter, active in Russia.

== Biography ==
His father was a parochial school teacher and organist. He received his general education at a Lutheran school in Riga. In 1850, he went to Saint Petersburg to study drafting and lithography. While there, he began taking evening classes at the Imperial Academy of Arts and was admitted as a full student two years later. His primary instructor was Pyotr Basin. By 1859, he was already competing for artistic awards. In 1861, he received the title of artist first-class and a gold medal. He soon began creating icons in the local churches, notably the Cathedral of the Intercession in Yelabuga, as well as creating sketches of folk life on behalf of the Russian Geographical Society.

In 1863, he was awarded a fellowship that allowed him to travel in Germany, although he eventually settled in Paris and exhibited at the Salon of 1868. Upon his return to Saint Petersburg in 1872, he was named an academician and later elevated to a professorship. Over the next few years, he finished work started in Paris and focused on paintings of a religious nature. He was also a member of the "Society of Travelling Art Exhibitions" (Peredvizhniki).

In 1874, he married Vera Monighetti, daughter of the architect Ippolit Monighetti. That same year, he began displaying symptoms of tuberculosis. On the advice of his doctors, he sought out climates with fresher, healthier air than Saint Petersburg, but the disease progressed and, after living in several locations, he died in Switzerland at the age of 45.

== Selected paintings ==
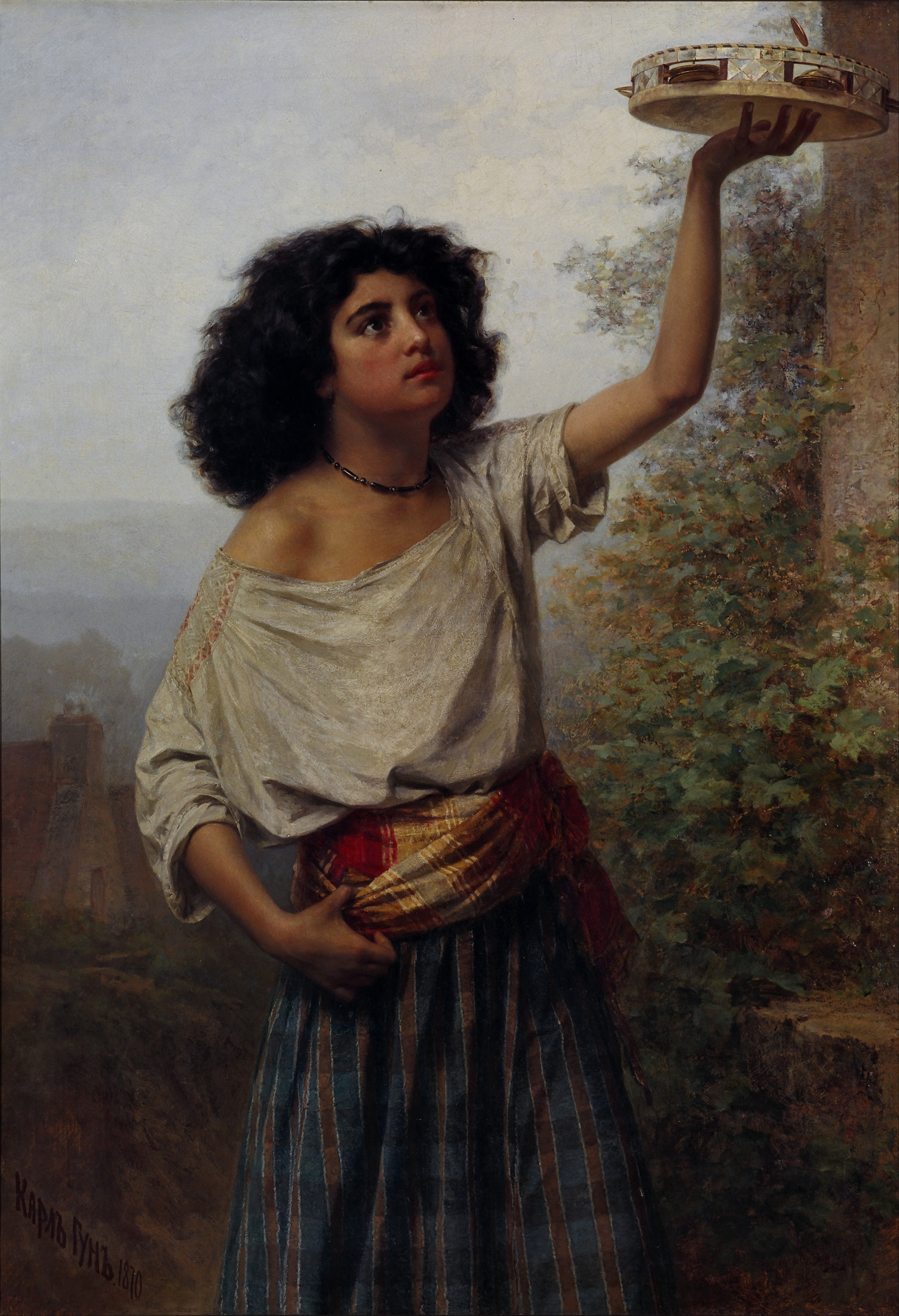
Young Gypsy Woman with Tambourine (1870)

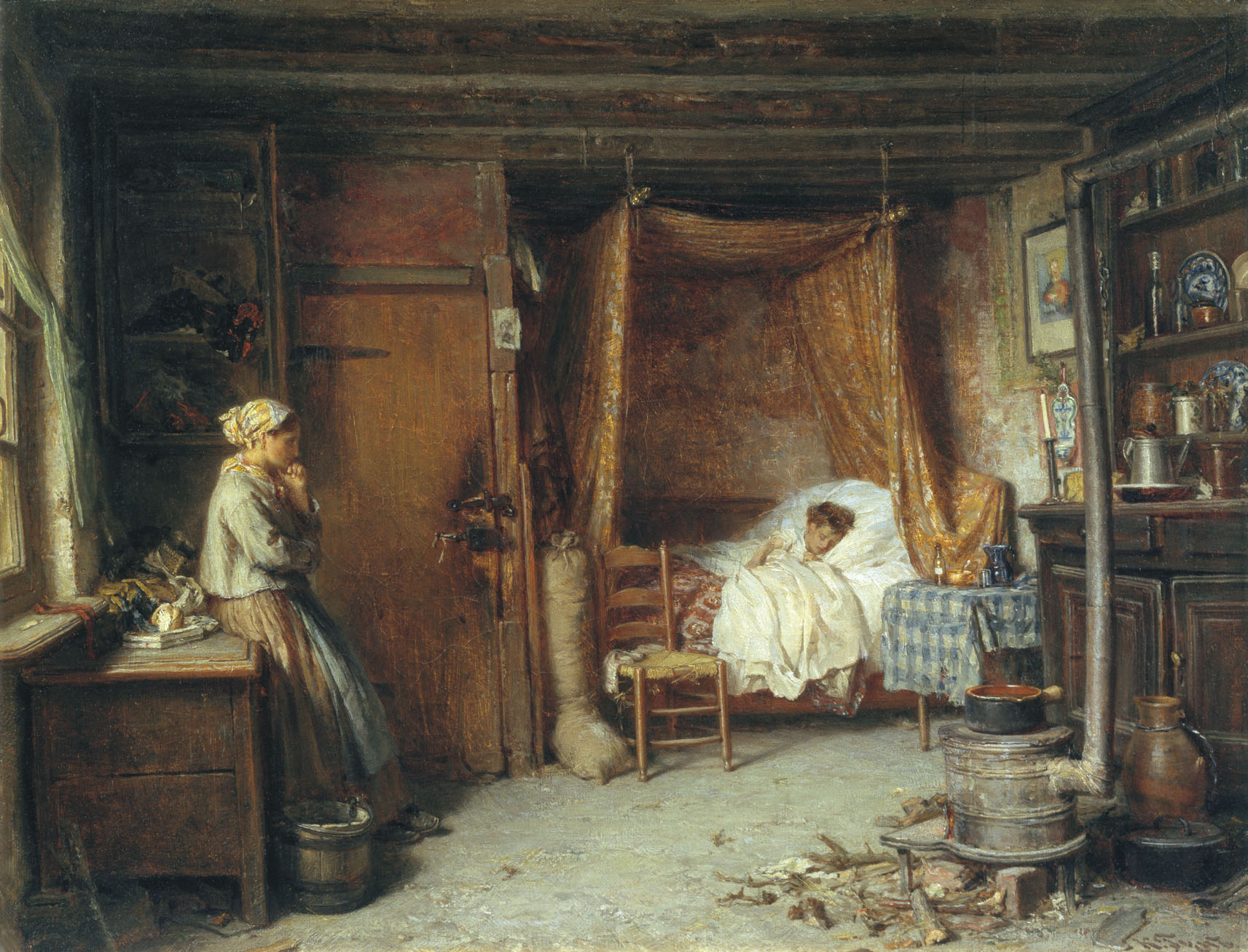
Sick Child (1869)

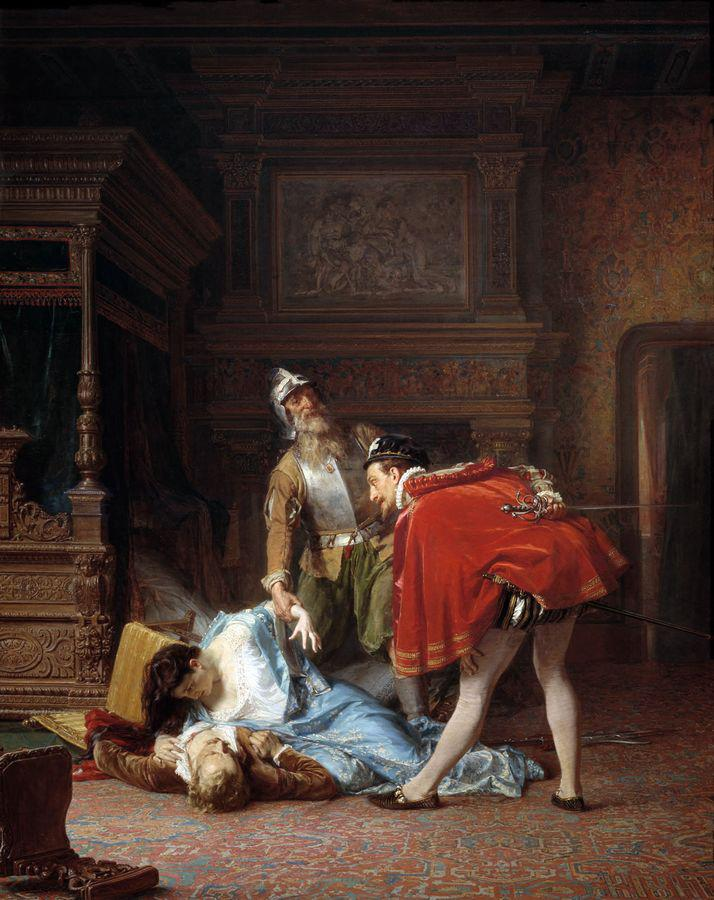
A Scene From the Saint Bartholomew's Day Massacre (1870)

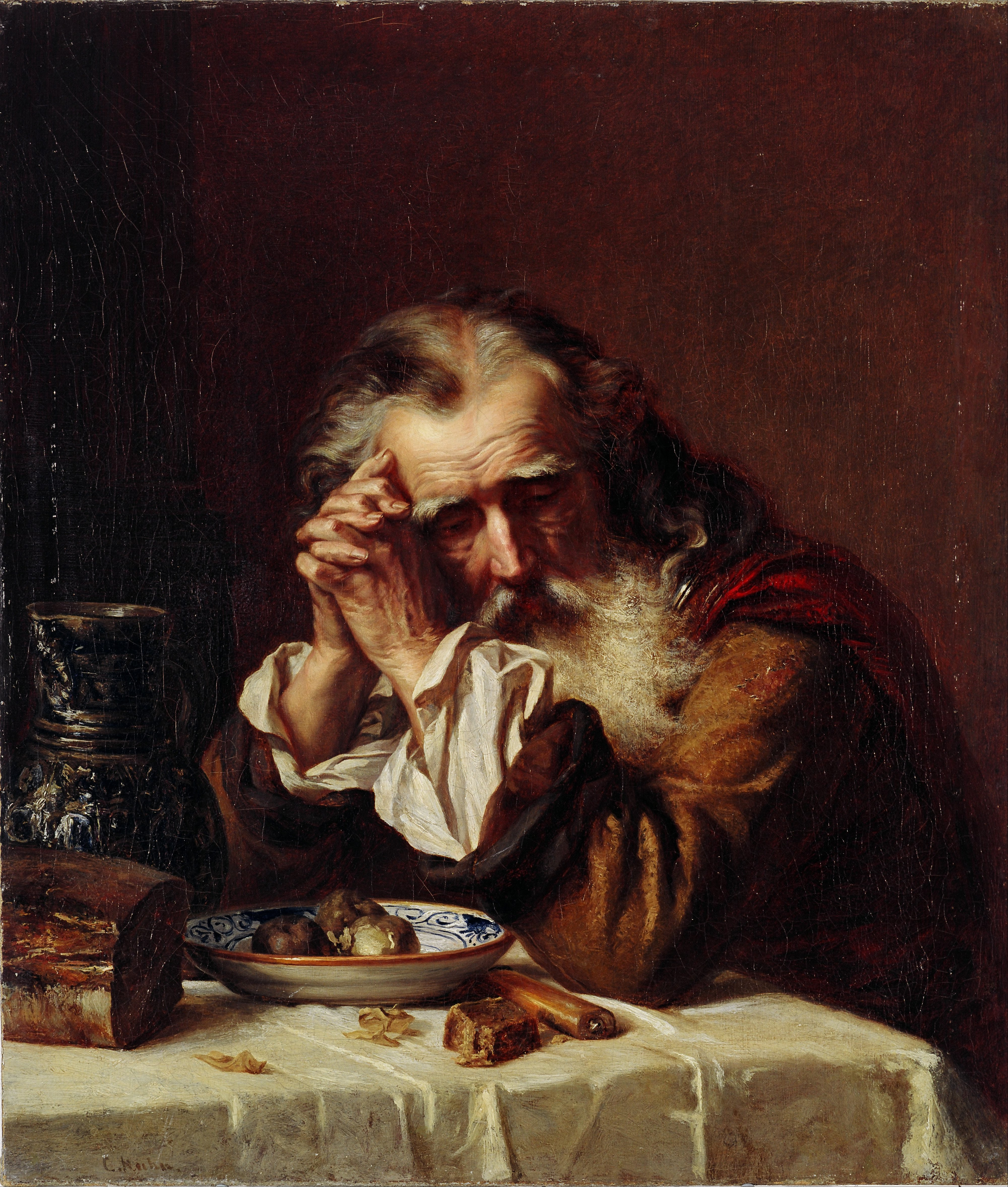
Old Man's Head (1872)

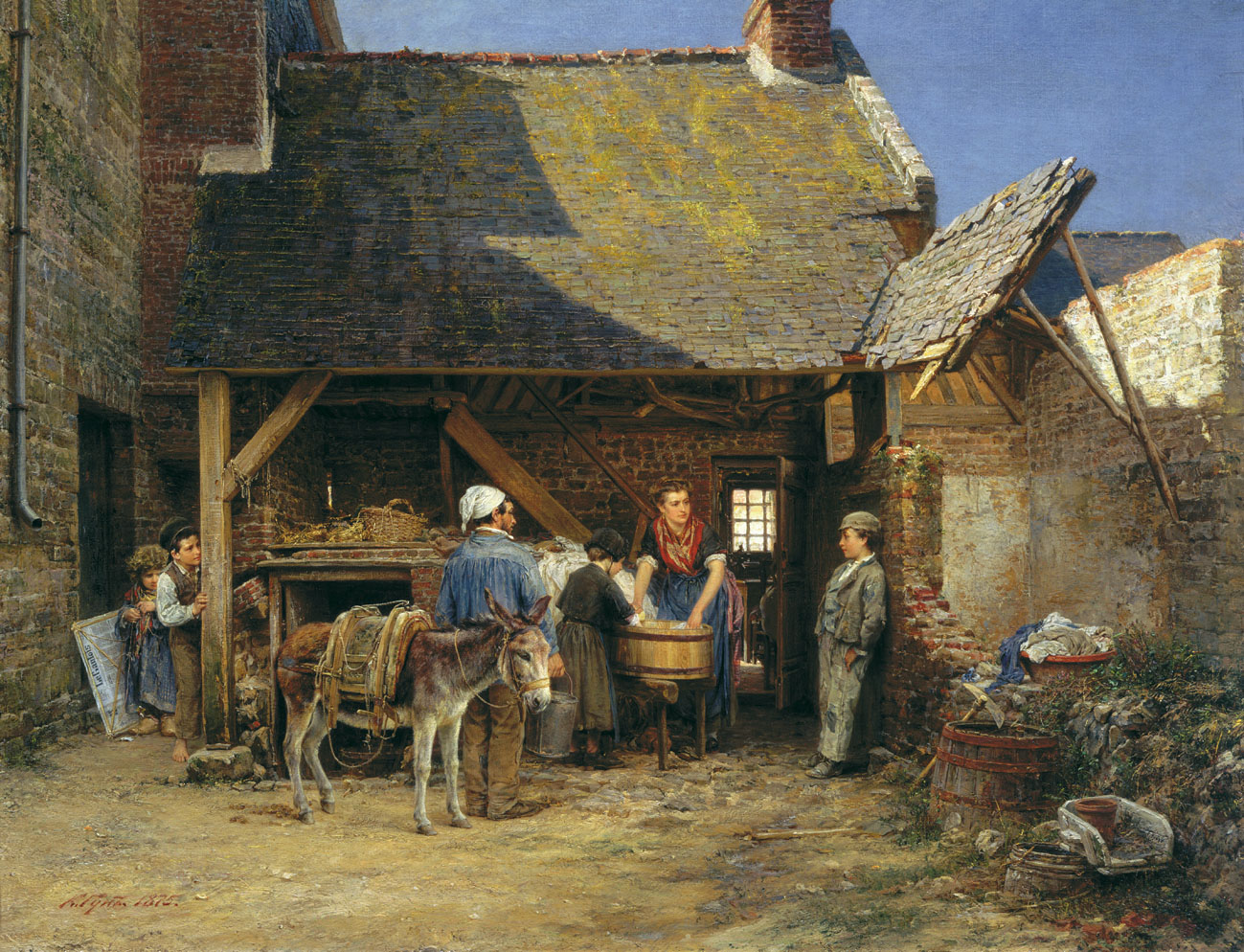
He's Going to Get It! (1875)

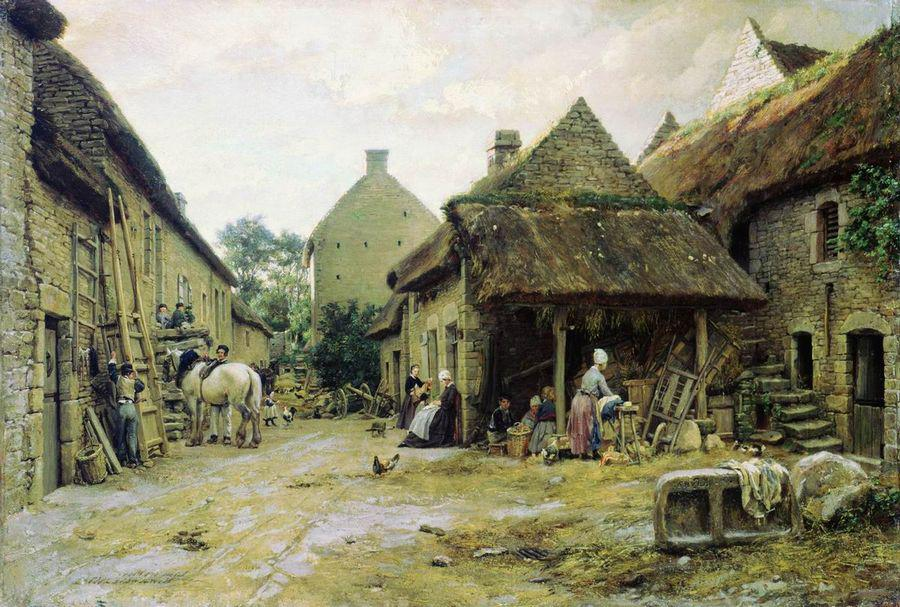
Normandy (1867)

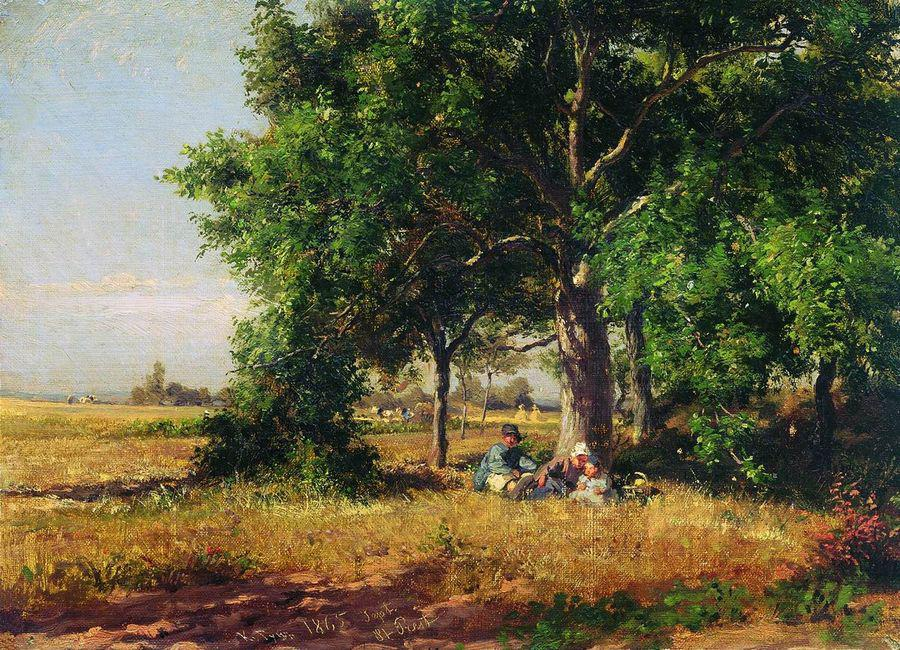
In the vicinity of Saint-Prest, France (1865)

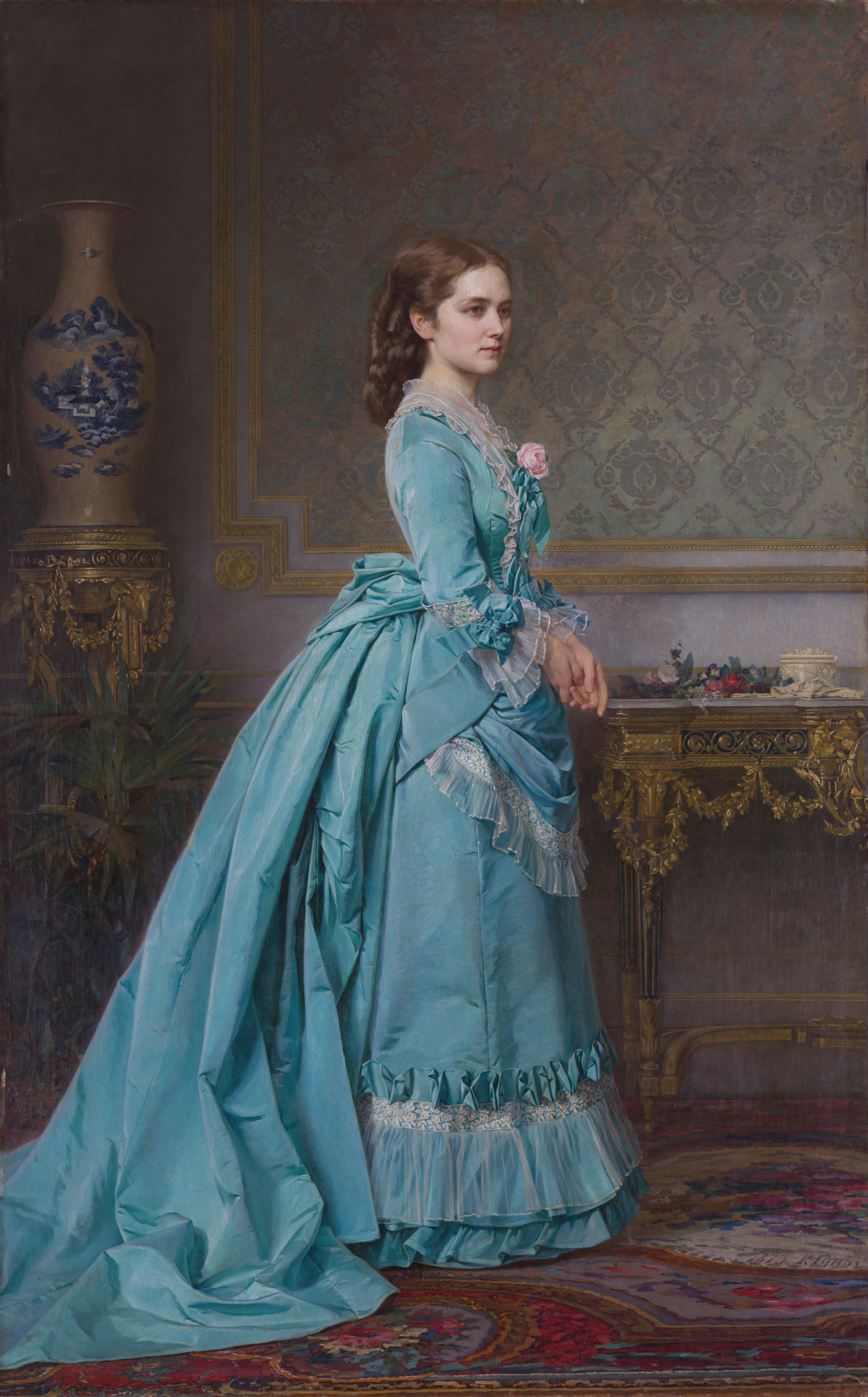
Portrait of a lady in blue (Varvara Grigorievna Soldatenkova née Phillipson; 1873)

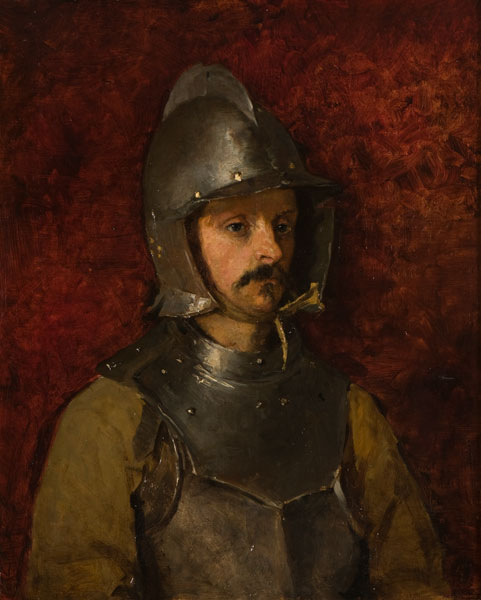
Knight (c. 1870)
