= Airat Khairullin =

Russian politician (1970–2020)

- Айрат Хайруллин
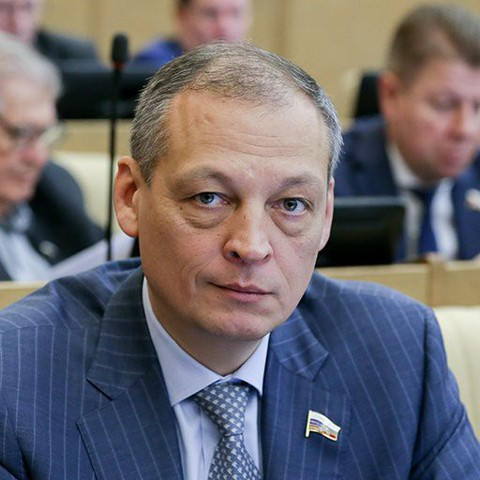
- Khairullin in 2016

Member of the State Duma for Tatarstan
- In office 5 October 2016 – 7 February 2020
- Preceded by: Constituency Re-established
- Succeeded by: Oleg Morozov
- Constituency: Nizhnekamsk (No. 28)
- In office 29 December 2003 – 24 December 2007
- Preceded by: Sergey Shashurin
- Succeeded by: Constituencies Abolished
- Constituency: Privolzhsky (No. 26)

Member of the State Duma (Party List Seat)
- In office 24 December 2007 – 5 October 2016

Personal details
- Born: 1 August 1970 Kazan, Tatar ASSR, USSR
- Died: 7 February 2020 (aged 49) Laishevsky District, Tatarstan, Russia
- Party: United Russia
- Children: 3
- Parents: Nazip Garifullovich Khairullin (father); Khatira Sungatovna (mother)
- Education: Maxim Gorki Agriculture Institute, Kazan; Mari State Technical University
- Occupation: Economist; Businessman-entrepreneur; Politician-statesman

Airat Nazipovich Khairullin (Russian: Айрат Назипович Хайруллин; Tatar: Айрат Нәҗип улы Хәйруллин; 1 August 1970 – 7 February 2020) was a Russian economist, millionaire-businessman, and politician-statesman (United Russia party) from Tatarstan. He served as a member of the State Duma between 2003 and his death in 2020. Within the Duma, he was a member of the Agriculture Policy Committee.

== Life ==
Khairullin was born and grew up in Kazan where his father (whom he would predecease), the distinguished economist Nazip Garifullovich Khairullin, was department head at the State University of Agriculture. Khatira Sungatovna, his mother, was noted as an agronomist: she worked at the Ministry of Agriculture for the State of Tatarstan.

Airat Nazipovich graduated from Kazan's Maxim Gorki Agriculture Institute (as it had been known up to that time) in 1991 with a degree-level qualification in the economic organisation of agricultural production. During the two decades that followed he was able to combine a hugely successful entrepreneurial career, mostly in the agri-food sector, with further education. In 2006 he embarked on a postgraduate degree course in economics from the Mari State Technical University (as the Volga State University was known before 2012) in Mari El, successfully defending his concluding dissertation and receiving his doctorate in 2009.

During the 1990s, as Russia's entrepreneurship boom unfolded, and while still a student, Airat Khairullin teamed up with his brother lshat Khairullin to enter the world of business. Between 1992 and 1994 he was director of "Фирма Эдельвейс" ("... Edelweiß"), a private company, which the two of them set up in Kazan, and which continued to operate as a real estate business nearly thirty years later. Between 1994 and 1996 he served as CEO at "Edelweiß", which during this period became a limited liability partnership. In 1994 he organised the working of a plant producing carbonated drinks and mineral water. The next year he set up the "Regina" confectionery factory. He launched and took control at the "Edelweiß-M" dairy plant, and was the founder and co-owner of numerous other factories: there were 16 in all. During the early years of the twenty-first century he divested himself of some of his businesses: the large "Edelweiß-M" dairy business became part of "Юнимилк" ("Unimilk") (later integrated into Danone Russia) in 2002.

In 1995, still aged just 25, Khairullin was elected to membership of the Kazan City Council. He was the youngest member of it. He served as a city councillor, on a part-time basis, between 1995 and 1999. He then progressed his political career up to state level, serving as a member of the Tatarstan state parliament between 1999 and 2003. He served as a member of the parliamentary committee on ecology, management of the natural environment, agri-foods and foods policy.

Meanwhile he remained closely engaged in his business activities. Between 1996 and 2003 he was head and co-owner of Kazan's "Krasny Vostok Brewing Company", serving as the company's CEO between April and October 1996, and thereafter, till December 2003, as chairman of the executive board.

In December 2003 Airat Nazipovich Khairullin stood successfully for election to the State Duma (lower house of parliament / "Государственная дума"), to represent the single member constituency No. 27 (Naberezhnye Chelny and Kazan). Four years later, in 2007, his name was included on the party list for United Russia, and when the mandates were distributed he had again become one of the 450 members of the State Duma, now of the 5th "convocation". He was re-elected in 2011 and again in 2016.

In August 2008 Khairullin was elected to the presidency of the National Milk Producers' Union.

On September 10, 2012, deputies Dmitry Gudkov and Ilya Ponomarev published a post on LiveJournal titled "United Russia’s Golden Pretzels-4. Kuban Bacon", in which Ayrat Khayrullin is mentioned, among other things, as having shares in 99 agricultural enterprises (while only 43 are declared), 24 of which were established during his term as a deputy, and LLC Solntsevo Niva was founded on August 13, 2012 — during the work of the 6th State Duma. Ayrat Khayrullin is also listed by Yabloko party leader Sergey Mitrokhin as a deputy who acquired business assets while in office.

== Death ==
On 7 February 2020 three men were travelling home in Airat Khairullin's private Bell 407 helicopter. One was the pilot and the second was Khairullin's personal assistant. Khairullin himself was the third man. The craft hit the ground 30 kilometers short of Kazan and 6 kilometers outside Laishevo, during what many sources identify as "a hard landing" and some call simply "a crash". The crash site was on marshy ground some 6 km from the vast Kuybyshev Reservoir: the emergency services arrived on their rescue mission by hovercraft. Initial reports were confused, but it subsequently emerged that Khairullin's pilot and assistant had been gravely injured and taken to hospital: their lives were not in danger. Airat Khairullin had "died immediately", however.

Following the fatal accident the authorities opened a criminal investigation. Initial reports indicated the most likely causes to have been adverse weather, a technical malfunction and/or pilot error.

The funeral was held on 8 February 2020 at the Tatar State Philharmonic concert Hall (named in honour of the poet Ğabdulla Tuqay) in Kazan. It was followed by a lengthy memorial meeting at which senior government officials and party leaders (and others) delivered a series of warm tributes to the deceased. Khairullin's body was buried next to that of his mother later that same day in the Muslim Cemetery at Mirny (Kazan).

== Personal life ==
Airat Khairullin was married with two sons and a daughter.

== Recognition and celebration ==
- 2004: Honoured Farms Worker of the Republic of Tatarstan.
- 2007: Order of Honour for contributions to law making, strengthening and developing Russian statehood.
- 2019: Forbes Magazine ranked Airat Khairullin 46th on an estimates-based list of Russia's 100 top earning public servants. He his name has also appeared on other "Forbes Lists" on account of his wealth.
- 2020: Paying tribute to his younger brother directly after the latter's funeral, lshat Khairullin placed emphasis on Airat Khairullin's generosity. When the boys had been given sweets and candies, the older boy had always been impatient to eat his. Airat had always set the booty aside, however, in order to be able to share it later with others.
- Certificate of Honour from the President of Tatarstan
- Letter of thanks from the President of Tatarstan

== See also ==
- List of members of the State Duma of Russia who died in office
