= Fatikh Sibagatullin =

Russian politician (1950–2022)

- Фатих Сибәгатуллин
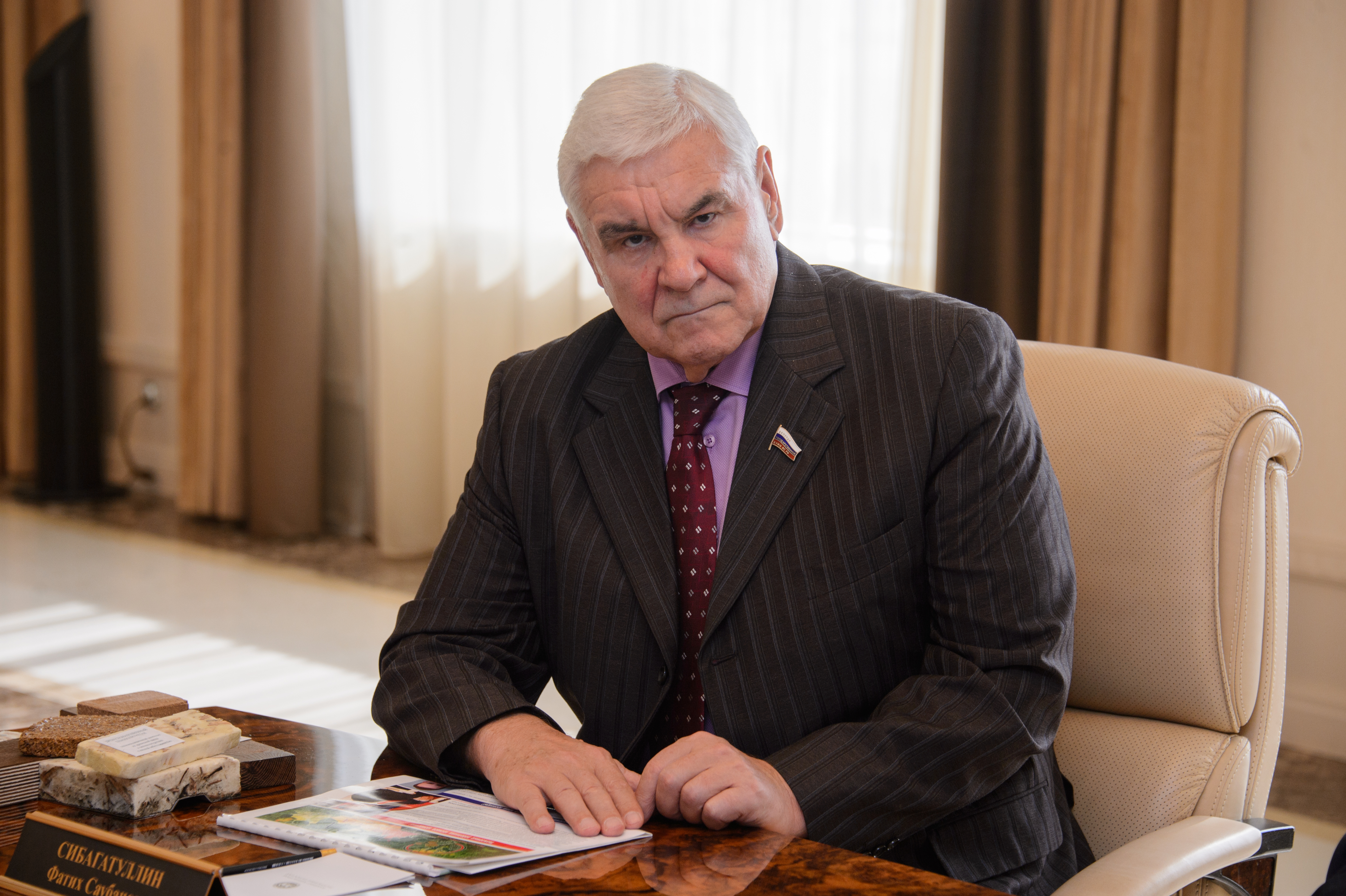
- Sibagatullin in 2015

Member of the State Duma for Tatarstan
- In office 5 October 2016 – 12 October 2021
- Preceded by: constituency re-established
- Succeeded by: Ilia Volfson
- Constituency: Privolzhsky (No. 26)

Member of the State Duma (Party List Seat)
- In office 24 December 2007 – 5 October 2016

Member of the State Council of the Republic of Tatarstan
- In office 2000–2004

Personal details
- Born: Fatikh Saubanovich Sibagatullin; 1 May 1950 Apazovo, Tatar ASSR, Russian SFSR, Soviet Union
- Died: 24 June 2022 (aged 72) Moscow, Russia
- Party: CPSU; United Russia
- Education: Bauman Kazan State Academy of Veterinary Medicine

Fatikh Saubanovich Sibagatullin (Russian: Фатих Саубанович Сибагатуллин; Tatar: Фатих Саубан улы Сибәгатуллин; 1 May 1950 – 24 June 2022) was a Russian politician. A member of United Russia, he served in the State Duma from 2007 to 2021.

Sibagatullin died in Moscow on 24 June 2022 at the age of 72.
