= Young Gypsy Woman =

1870 painting by Kārlis Hūns

- Jaunā čigāniete (Latvian)
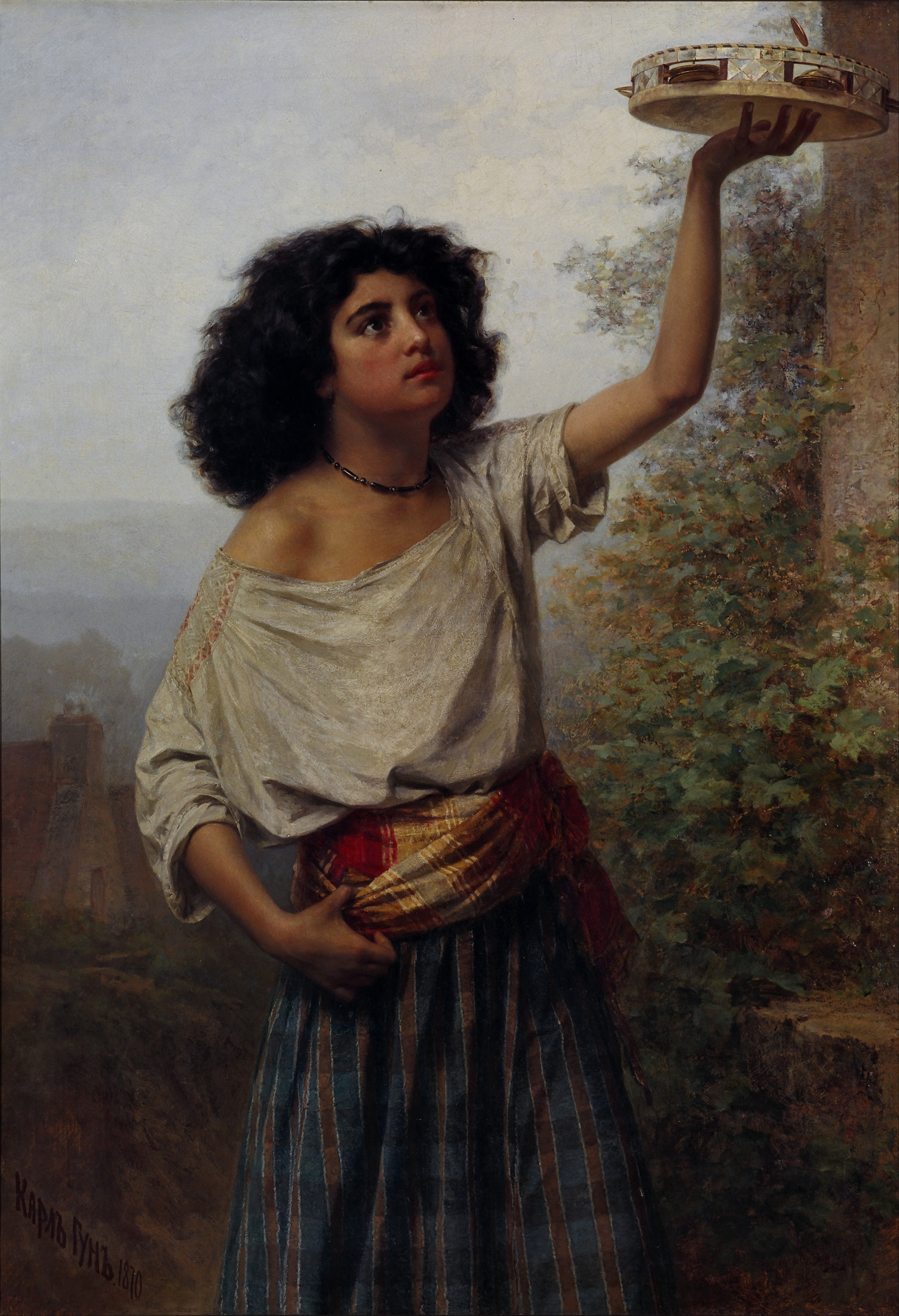
- Artist: Kārlis Hūns
- Year: 1870
- Medium: oil on canvas
- Dimensions: 132 cm × 228 cm (90 in × 125 in)
- Location: Latvian National Museum of Art, Riga

Young Gypsy Woman is a painting by Kārlis Hūns from 1870. It is located in the Latvian National Museum of Art.

== Genesis ==
The painting was created in the summer of 1870, when Hūns participated in the Paris salon, and afterwards went to Normandy and then Belgium, where this painting was created.
