= Sergey Shashurin =

Russian politician (1957–2026)

- Сергей Шашурин

Deputy of the State Duma for the Privolzhsky constituency
- In office 17 January 1996 – 29 December 2003
- Preceded by: Valentin Mikhaylov
- Succeeded by: Airat Khairullin

Personal details
- Born: 12 January 1957 Nizhniye Vyazovye, Zelenodolsky District, Tatar ASSR, Russian SFSR, Soviet Union
- Died: 16 June 2026 (aged 69) Kazan, Russia
- Profession: Politician; businessman

Sergey Petrovich Shashurin (Russian: Сергей Петрович Шашурин; 12 January 1957 – 16 June 2026) was a Russian businessman and politician who was a deputy of the State Duma (1995–2003).

Shashurin died in Kazan on 16 June 2026, at the age of 69.
