= Ilia Volfson =

Russian politician

- Илья Вольфсон
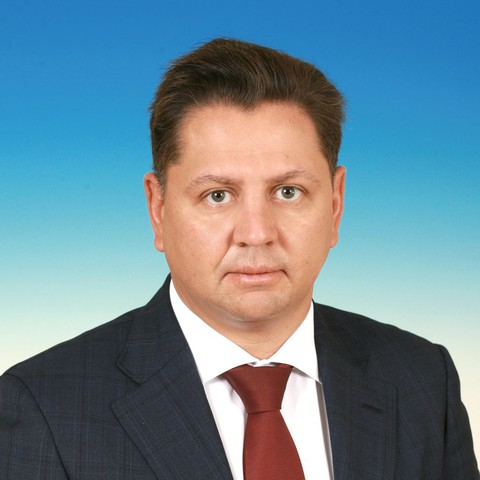
- official portrait, circa 2021

Member of the State Duma
- Incumbent
- Assumed office 12 October 2021
- Preceded by: Fatikh Sibagatullin
- Constituency: Privolzhsky (No. 26)

Personal details
- Born: 8 June 1981 (age 45) Kazan, Tatar ASSR, USSR
- Party: United Russia
- Education: Kazan National Research Technological University

Ilia Svetoslavovich Volfson (Russian: Илья Светославович Вольфсон; born 8 June 1981 in Kazan) is a Russian politician and businessman who has served as a deputy of the State Duma since 2021.

From 2003 to 2005, Volfson worked at the Inkomstroy, first as a senior manager and later as deputy director. From 2007 to 2016, he was the deputy director and co-owner of the Siti Stroy company. He left the post to become the director of the group of companies SMU-88. In 2015, he became the deputy of the Kazan City Duma of the 3rd convocation. In 2019-2021, he was the deputy of the State Council of the Republic of Tatarstan. Since September 2021, he has served as deputy of the 8th State Duma from the Privolzhsky constituency.

== Sanctions ==
He was sanctioned by Canada under the Special Economic Measures Act (S.C. 1992, c. 17) in relation to the Russian invasion of Ukraine for Grave Breach of International Peace and Security, and by the UK government on 11 March 2022 in relation to the Russo-Ukrainian War.
