= Kazan State Agricultural University =

Agricultural university in Kazan, Russia

- Казанский государственный аграрный университет (Russian)
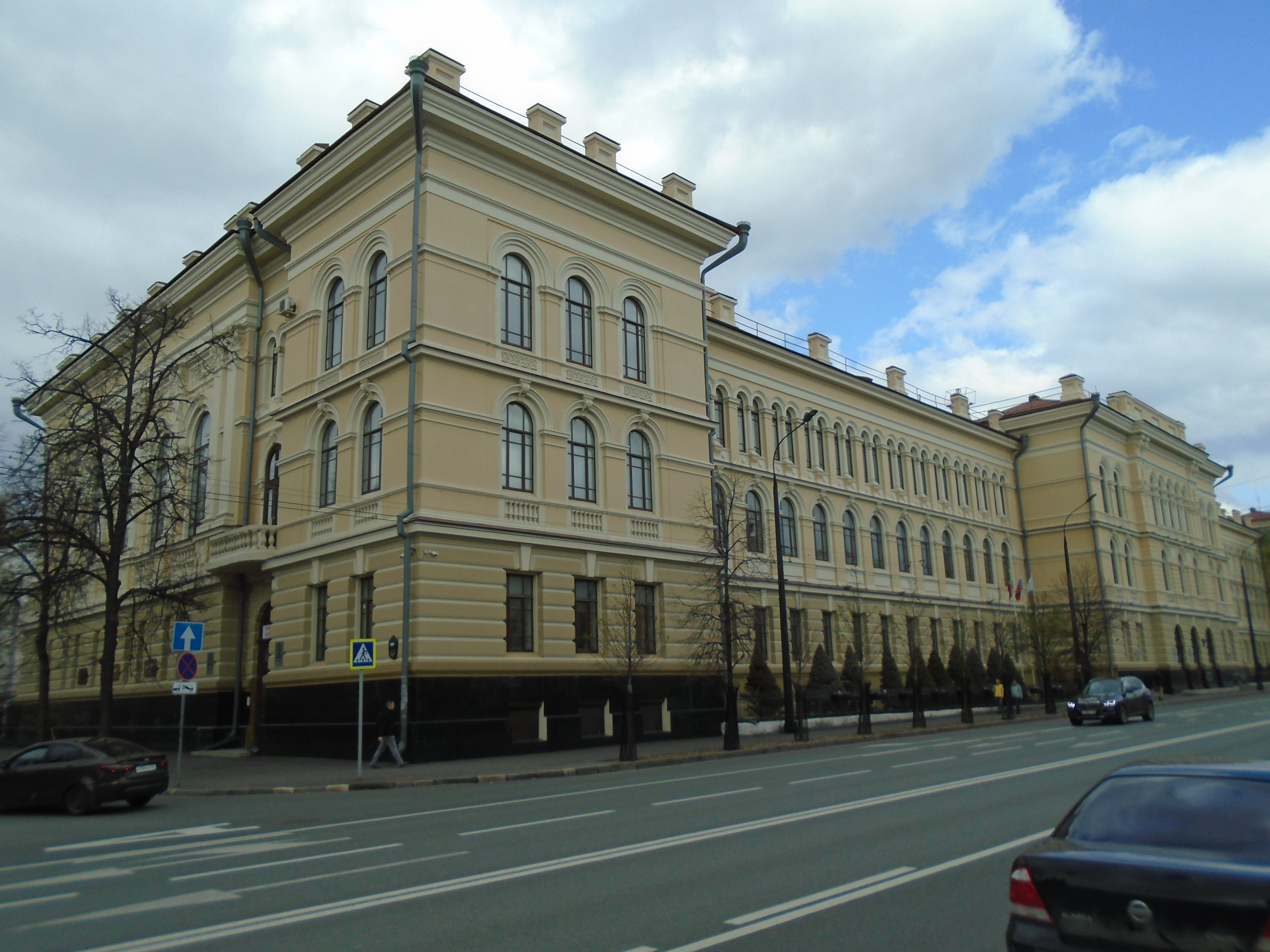
- Type: Public research
- Established: 22 May 1922
- Location: 65 Karl Marx Street, Kazan, Russia; 54°43′02″N 49°09′53″E
- Campus: Urban
- Website: kazgau.ru

Kazan State Agricultural University (Russian: Казанский государственный аграрный университет, romanized: Kazanskiy gosudarstvennyy agrarnyy universitet; Tatar: Казан дәүләт аграр университеты, romanized: Qazan däwlät ağrar universitetı), or formally, the Federal State Budgetary Educational Institution of Higher Education "Kazan State Agrarian University" (Russian: Федеральное государственное бюджетное образовательное учреждение высшего профессионального образования «Казанский государственный аграрный университет», romanized: Federal'noe gosudarstvennoe byudzhetnoe obrazovatel'noe uchrezhdenie vysshego professional'nogo obrazovaniya «Kazanskiy gosudarstvennyy agrarnyy universitet») is a higher educational institution in the system of training, retraining and advanced training of employees of the Russian Ministry of Agriculture, located in the city of Kazan, Tatarstan, Russia.

== History ==
On 22 May 1922, the Kazan Institute of Agriculture and Forestry was established through the merger of the agricultural faculty of the Polytechnic Institute and the forest faculty of Kazan University. Over the past years, the structure of the institute has repeatedly changed. In different periods, training was conducted at the zootechnical faculty, fruit and vegetable, agroforestry.
