= Irek Murtazin =

Russian journalist

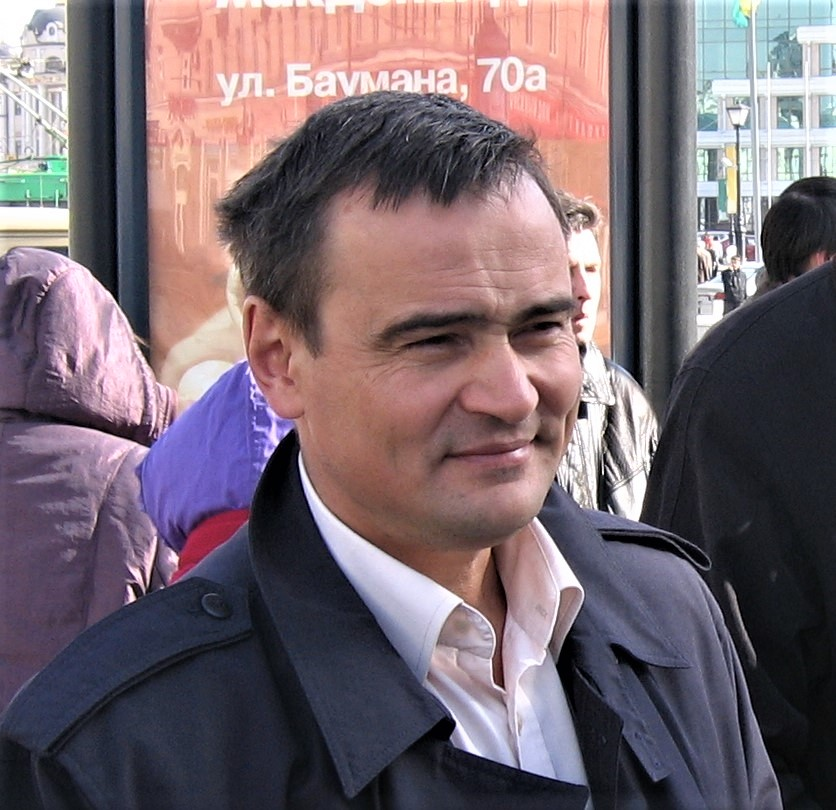
- Murtazin in 2008
- Born: Irek Minzakievich Murtazin; 5 April 1964 (age 62); Bogatye Saby, Sabinsky District, Tatar ASSR, RSFSR, USSR
- Occupations: journalist, activist, blogger
- Children: 2
- Family: married
- Website: irek-murtazin.livdjournal.com

Irek Minzakievich Murtazin (Tatar: Ирек Мортазин, romanized: İrek Mortazin: Russian: Ирек Минзакиевич Муртазин; born 5 April 1964, Bogatye Saby) is a Russian journalist and blogger of Tatar descent, specialist of the International Institute of Research in Policy and the Humanities in Moscow and, since September 2008, publisher of the newspaper Kazan News (Russian: Казанские вести).

In September 2008, he posted information to his blog to the effect that Tatar president Shaimiev had died; this information proved to be false. As a result, he was the subject of a criminal investigation into the matter. On 26 November 2009, Murtazin was found guilty of libel and "instigating hatred and hostility" to an ethnic or social group and sentenced to 1 year, 9 months of hard labor. Murtazin had previously clashed with local and federal elites in his journalistic work; he resigned his post at "Tatarstan" on 14 November 2003 in the wake of a controversial segment in which program participants criticized Tatar policies and the war in Chechnya. In December 2008, he was attacked and beaten near his Kazan apartment by unidentified persons.

== Works ==
In addition to his work as a newspaper and television journalist, Murtazin has published several monographs.

- The Last Romantic (Russian: Последний романтик)
- The Death of a Television Magnate (Russian: Смерть телемагната)
- The Island of Tatarstan (Russian: Остров Татарстан)
- Mintimer Shaimiev: Last President of Tatarstan (Russian: Минтимер Шаймиев: последний президент Татарстана) (Cheboksary, 2007)
