= Toyma =

Toyma, Tuyma
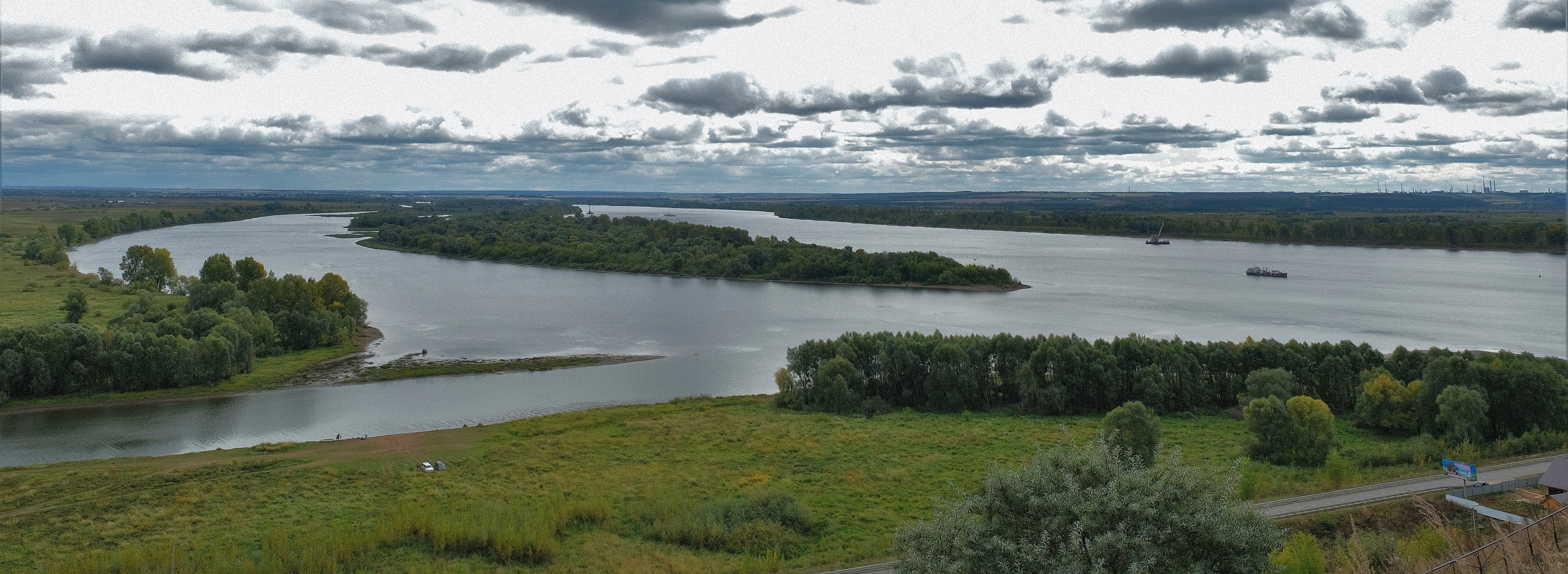

Location
- Country: Tatarstan and Udmurtia, Russia

Physical characteristics
- Source
  - location: Udmurtia
  - coordinates: 56°19′12″N 52°24′24″E
- Mouth: Kama
  - location: near Yelabuga, Tatarstan
  - coordinates: 55.7423°N 52.0315°E
  - elevation: 53 m (174 ft)
- Length: 121 km (75 mi)
- Basin size: 1,450 km^{2} (560 sq mi)

Basin features
- Progression: Kama→ Volga→ Caspian Sea

The Toyma (Russian: Тойма; Tatar: Туйма) is a river in Udmurtia and Tatarstan, Russian Federation, a right-bank tributary of the Kama. It is 121 kilometres (75 mi) long, of which 84 kilometres (52 mi) are in Tatarstan, and its drainage basin covers 1,450 square kilometres (560 mi^{2}). It begins in Udmurtia and falls to the Kama near Yelabuga, Tatarstan.

Major tributaries are the Vozzhayka, Yurashka, Karinka rivers. The maximal mineralization 400–600 mg/L. The maximal water discharge was 533 cubic metres per second (18,800 cu ft/s) in 1979. Drainage is regulated. Average sediment accumulation at the mouth per year is 146 millimetres (5.7 in). Since 1978 it is protected as a natural monument of Tatarstan. Mendeleyevsk and Yelabuga are along the river.
