= Tübän Yäke =

Tübän Yäke Түбән Яке
- selo
- Location within Tatarstan
- Country: Russia
- Region: Tatarstan
- District: Mamadış District
- Time zone: UTC+3:00

Tübän Yäke (Tatar: Түбән Яке, romanized: Tübän Yäke) is a rural locality (a selo) in Mamadış District, Tatarstan. The population was 287 as of 2010. Tübän Yäke is located 30 km from Mamаdış, district's administrative centre, and 137 km from Ԛazаn, republic's capital, by road. The village was established in 18th century. There are 9 streets in the village.
