= Yelabuga =

Town in the Republic of Tatarstan, Russia

Yelabuga Елабуга
- Town

Other transcription(s)
  - Tatar: Алабуга
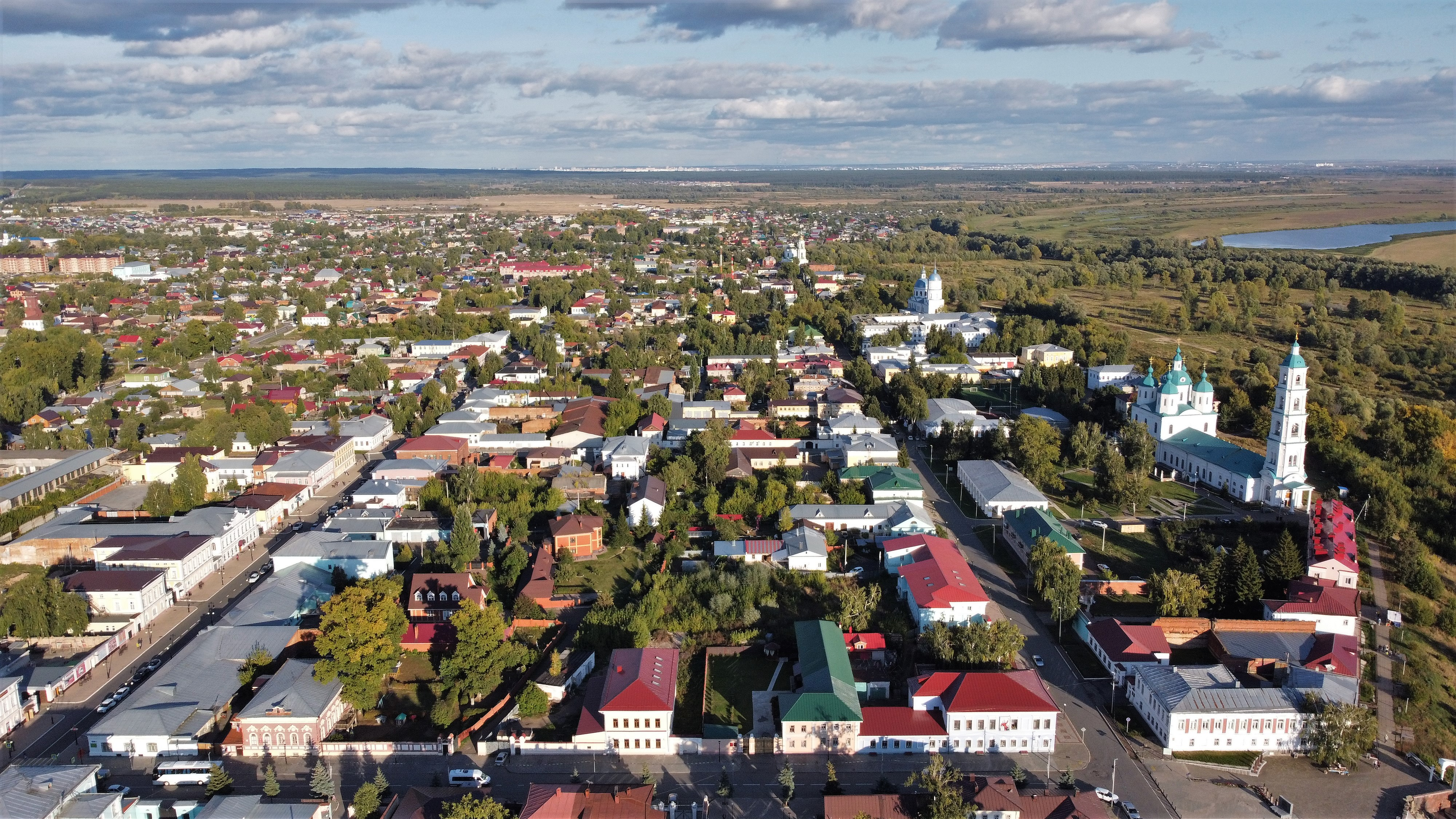
- Aerial view of Yelabuga

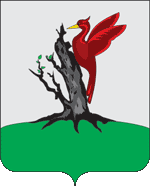
- Coat of arms
- Interactive map of Yelabuga
- Location of Yelabuga Yelabuga (Tatarstan)
- Coordinates: 55°46′N 52°05′E
- Country: Russia
- Federal subject: Tatarstan
- Founded: 1051
- Elevation: 70 m (230 ft)

Population (2010 Census)
  - Total: 70,728
  - Estimate (2021): 73,630 (+4.1%)
  - Rank: 222nd in 2010

Administrative status
  - Subordinated to: town of republic significance of Yelabuga
  - Capital of: town of republic significance of Yelabuga, Yelabuzhsky District

Municipal status
  - Municipal district: Yelabuzhsky Municipal District
  - Urban settlement: Yelabuga Urban Settlement
  - Capital of: Yelabuzhsky Municipal District, Yelabuga Urban Settlement
- Time zone: UTC+3 (MSK)
- Postal code: 423600
- Dialing code: +7 85557
- OKTMO ID: 92626101001

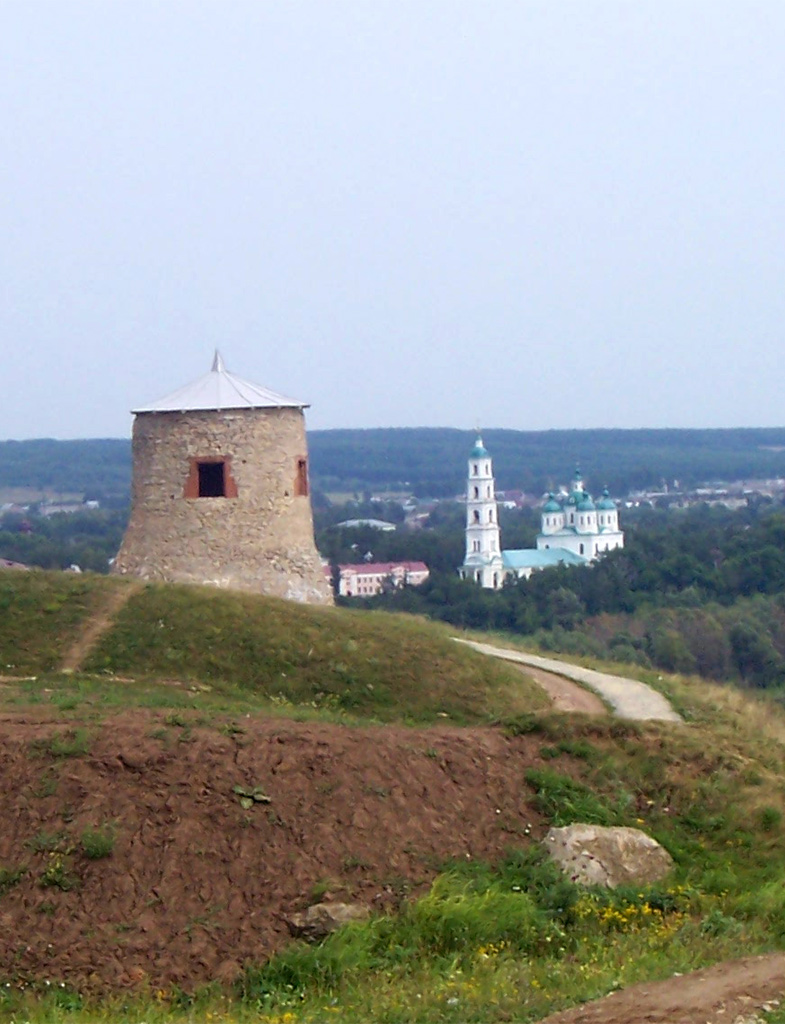
The Devil's Tower, a unique architectural monument surviving from Volga Bulgaria

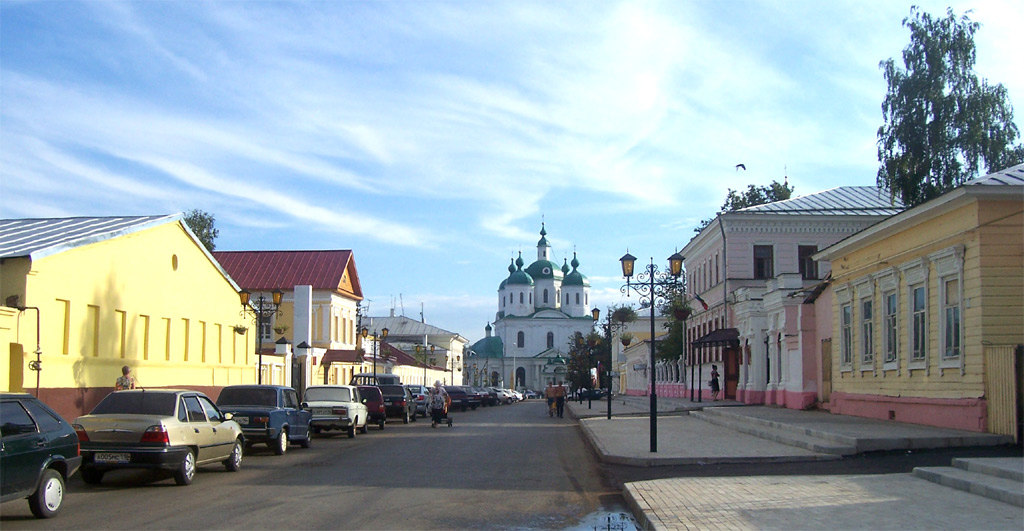
Spasskaya Street

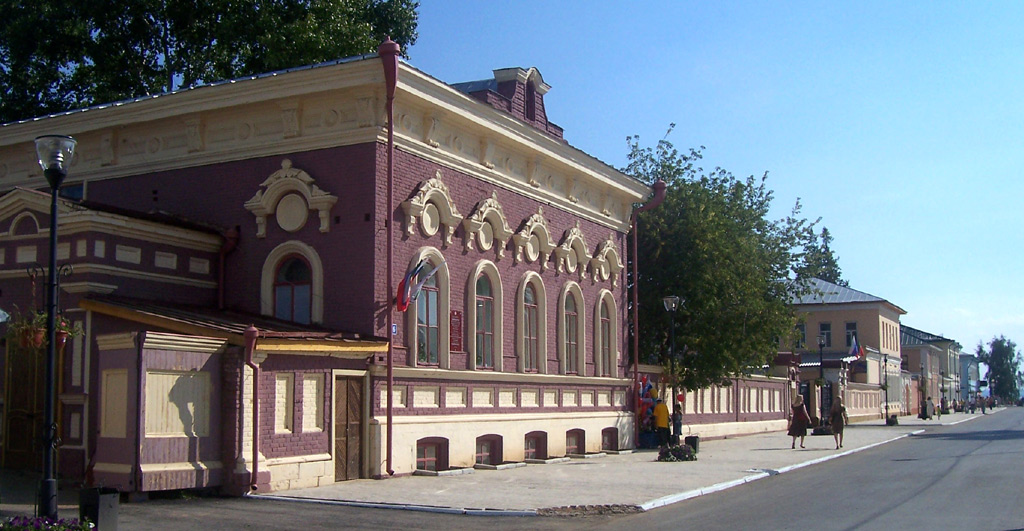
Gassara Street

Yelabuga (also spelled Elabuga; Russian: Елабуга; Tatar: Алабуга, romanized: Alabuğa) is a town in Tatarstan, Russia, located on the right bank of the Kama River and 200 kilometers (120 mi) east from Kazan. Population: 70,728 (2010 census); 68,663 (2002 census); 53,537 (1989 Soviet census).

== Etymology ==
The name of the city of Yelabuga comes from the Turkic personal name Alabuga (lit. 'mottled bull', where buga — 'bull' symbolizes the strength and power of the bearer of the name). According to another version, the name comes from the Tatar name of the nearby lake Alabuga (translated as 'perch').

At the end of the 16th century, in official documents, in addition to the main name Yelabuga, the church name Tresvyatskoye or Tresvyatskoye also began to be added. This name should not be confused with the village of Trekhsvyatskoye, which was founded near Yelabuga in 1851. The last mention of Yelabuga with the addition of the church name Tresvyatskoye in official documents dates back to 1701. After that, and before Yelabuga was given the status of a county town, this settlement was called exclusively the palace village of Yelabuga.

In local historical literature of the 19th century, the history of Yelabuga was associated with the ancient cities of Gelon and Bryakhimov. However, the historian A. Z. Nigamaev has contested these claims.

== Geography ==
It is located on the high right bank of the Kama River at the confluence of the Toyma River, 215 km east of the capital of the republic, Kazan. The area of the city is 41.1 km2. Begishevo International Airport is 40 km from Yelabuga.

== History ==
The former name of the city was Alabuga. Its history dates back to the 10th century, when a Volga Bulgar border castle, the so-called Alamir-Sultan castle was built by Bulgar Khan Ibrahim in 985 CE. The castle was built on the place of the legendary tomb of Alamir-Sultan (Alexander the Great "Macedonian"). The name 'Alabuga' originally referred to the tower of the castle, later the whole city was named Alabuga. The castle was later abandoned, and its remains are now known as Shaytan kalasy (Shaytan's castle). In the second half of the 16th century, a Russian village was founded on the same spot.

== Administrative and municipal status ==
Within the framework of administrative divisions, Yelabuga serves as the administrative center of Yelabuzhsky District, even though it is not a part of it. As an administrative division, it is, together with the selo of Tarlovka, incorporated separately as the town of republic significance of Yelabuga—an administrative unit with the status equal to that of the districts. As a municipal division, the town of republic significance of Yelabuga is incorporated within Yelabuzhsky Municipal District as Yelabuga Urban Settlement.

== Economy ==
Oil industry is present in the town. In the 1990s, a Ford assembly plant operated in the town. In 2008, Sollers JSC built a new factory to produce the Fiat Ducato, and from 2021, started to assemble a luxury vehicle called the Aurus Senat, for the Central Scientific Research Automobile and Automotive Engines Institute in Moscow (NAMI). There is also a factory for the production of household appliances: domestic oil electric heaters, electric meat grinders Italian group De'Longhi.

Public transportation needs are served by a bus and taxi networks. Plans for a trolleybus route are being discussed.

=== Climate ===
Climate data for Yelabuga
| Month | Jan | Feb | Mar | Apr | May | Jun | Jul | Aug | Sep | Oct | Nov | Dec | Year |
|---|---|---|---|---|---|---|---|---|---|---|---|---|---|
| Record high °C (°F) | 5.4 (41.7) | 5.6 (42.1) | 13.5 (56.3) | 29.0 (84.2) | 32.4 (90.3) | 36.8 (98.2) | 38.1 (100.6) | 39.2 (102.6) | 31.6 (88.9) | 24.2 (75.6) | 14.4 (57.9) | 13.0 (55.4) | 39.2 (102.6) |
| Mean daily maximum °C (°F) | −8.1 (17.4) | −7.1 (19.2) | −0.2 (31.6) | 10.3 (50.5) | 19.4 (66.9) | 24.0 (75.2) | 25.9 (78.6) | 22.9 (73.2) | 16.4 (61.5) | 7.9 (46.2) | −0.9 (30.4) | −6.1 (21.0) | 8.7 (47.7) |
| Daily mean °C (°F) | −11.6 (11.1) | −10.8 (12.6) | −4.3 (24.3) | 5.5 (41.9) | 13.5 (56.3) | 18.4 (65.1) | 20.4 (68.7) | 17.8 (64.0) | 11.9 (53.4) | 4.8 (40.6) | −3.5 (25.7) | −9.2 (15.4) | 4.4 (39.9) |
| Mean daily minimum °C (°F) | −15.0 (5.0) | −14.5 (5.9) | −8.4 (16.9) | 0.7 (33.3) | 7.5 (45.5) | 12.8 (55.0) | 14.8 (58.6) | 12.6 (54.7) | 7.4 (45.3) | 1.6 (34.9) | −6.0 (21.2) | −12.3 (9.9) | 0.1 (32.2) |
| Record low °C (°F) | −37.3 (−35.1) | −34.3 (−29.7) | −29.8 (−21.6) | −19.2 (−2.6) | −4.1 (24.6) | −0.6 (30.9) | 1.6 (34.9) | 1.0 (33.8) | −3.5 (25.7) | −12.5 (9.5) | −28.7 (−19.7) | −37.7 (−35.9) | −37.7 (−35.9) |
| Average precipitation mm (inches) | 37.8 (1.49) | 27.2 (1.07) | 28.2 (1.11) | 29.8 (1.17) | 46.9 (1.85) | 55.1 (2.17) | 57.8 (2.28) | 67.6 (2.66) | 58.5 (2.30) | 49.9 (1.96) | 45.1 (1.78) | 45.2 (1.78) | 549.1 (21.62) |
Source: Weather and climate in Yelabuga

== Notable people ==
The town is the birthplace of painter Ivan Shishkin. Nadezhda Durova, who, disguised as a man, was a highly decorated cavalry officer during the Napoleonic Wars died there in 1866. It is also where the Russian poet Marina Tsvetayeva committed suicide in 1941. The poet is buried at the municipal cemetery.

== Miscellaneous ==
Near Yelabuga is the Nizhnyaya Kama National Park.

== International relations ==
=== Twin towns and sister cities ===
Yelabuga is twinned with:

- Safranbolu, Turkey
- Aleksin, Russia
- Beryozovsky, Russia
