= Polyanki =

Polyanki (Russian: Полянки) is the name of several rural localities in Russia.

== Modern localities ==
- Polyanki, Chuvash Republic, a selo in Streletskoye Rural Settlement of Yadrinsky District in the Chuvash Republic; 55°57′N 46°07′E
- Polyanki, Ilyinsky District, Ivanovo Oblast, a village in Ilyinsky District of Ivanovo Oblast
- Polyanki, Komsomolsky District, Ivanovo Oblast, a village in Komsomolsky District of Ivanovo Oblast
- Polyanki, Kostroma Oblast, a village in Buyakovskoye Settlement of Susaninsky District in Kostroma Oblast; 58°08′N 41°26′E
- Polyanki, Saransk, Republic of Mordovia, a village in Zykovsky Selsoviet under the administrative jurisdiction of Oktyabrsky City District of the city of republic significance of Saransk in the Republic of Mordovia; 54°05′N 45°04′E
- Polyanki, Temnikovsky District, Republic of Mordovia, a selo in Zhegalovsky Selsoviet of Temnikovsky District in the Republic of Mordovia; 54°44′N 43°29′E
- Polyanki, Oryol Oblast, a settlement in Vysokinsky Selsoviet of Mtsensky District in Oryol Oblast; 53°06′N 36°45′E
- Polyanki, Rostov Oblast, a settlement in Kirovskoye Rural Settlement of Tselinsky District in Rostov Oblast; 46°28′N 40°43′E
- Polyanki, Kasimovsky District, Ryazan Oblast, a village in Lyubovnikovsky Rural Okrug of Kasimovsky District in Ryazan Oblast
- Polyanki, Spassky District, Ryazan Oblast, a village in Razberdeyevsky Rural Okrug of Spassky District in Ryazan Oblast
- Polyanki, Smolensk Oblast, a village in Oktyabrskoye Rural Settlement of Krasninsky District in Smolensk Oblast
- Polyanki, Republic of Tatarstan, a selo in Spassky District of the Republic of Tatarstan
- Polyanki, Ulyanovsk Oblast, a selo in Sursky Settlement Okrug in Sursky District of Ulyanovsk Oblast
- Polyanki, Vologda Oblast, a village in Nesvoysky Selsoviet of Vologodsky District in Vologda Oblast
- Polyanki, Yaroslavl Oblast, a selo in Tatishchevsky Rural Okrug of Rostovsky District in Yaroslavl Oblast

== Abolished localities ==
- Polyanki, Penza Oblast, a village in Zasechny Selsoviet of Mokshansky District in Penza Oblast; abolished in October 2011

== Historical names ==
- Polyanki, former name of Kamskiye Polyany, an urban-type settlement in Nizhnekamsky District of the Republic of Tatarstan

== Alternative names ==
- Polyanki, alternative name of Bolshiye Polyany, a selo in Redkodubsky Selsoviet of Ardatovsky District in the Republic of Mordovia; 54°51′N 46°07′E
