= Alkonost (band) =

Russian epic folk metal band

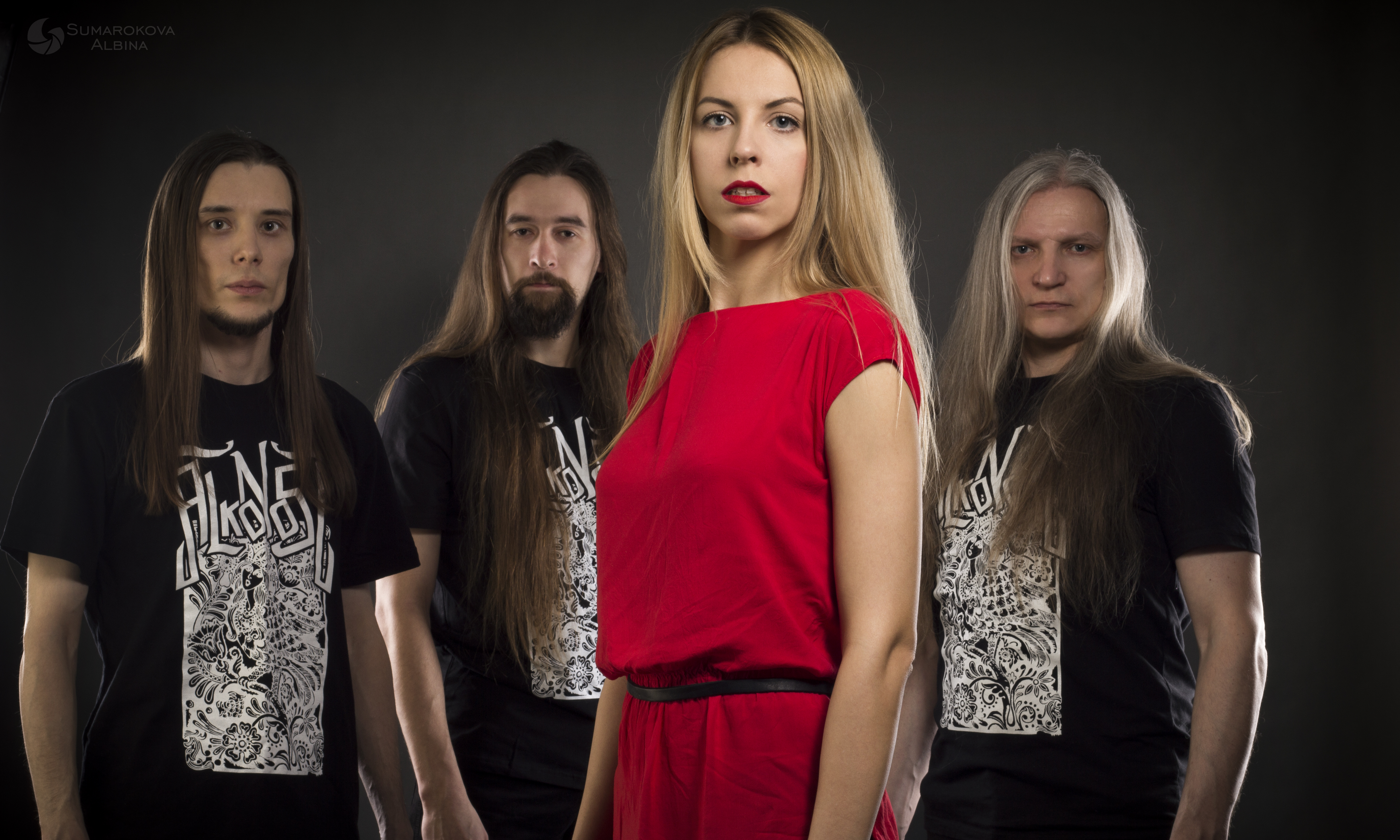
- Alkonost after show in S.-Petersburg, April 2023

Background information
- Origin: Naberezhnye Chelny, Tatarstan, Russia
- Genres: Folk metal
- Years active: 1996–present
- Labels: Art of the Night; Beverina; Black Death; Einheit; Ketzer; MetalAgen; Metalism; Sleaszy Rider; Sound Age; Soyuz; Vic
- Members: Andrey Losev; Ksenia Pobuzhanskaya; Pavel Kosolapov; Vadim Grozov
- Past members: Alexey Solovyov; Alexey Polkhovskyi; Sergey "Coocker" Medvedev; Vladimir Lushin; Almira Fatkhullina; Anton Chepigin; Alyona Pasynkova (Pelevina); Dmitry Sokolov; Max Shtanke; Anastasiya Ryabova; Rustem Shagitov
- Website: alkonost.ru

Alkonost is a Russian epic folk metal band formed in Naberezhnye Chelny, Tatarstan, Russia in 1995.

== Popularity ==
The band is best known amongst heavy metal fans in their native country of the Russian Federation. However, their music has been discussed and shared on the internet, particularly on Usenet, and they have found new audiences in the Nordic countries and United Kingdom. Signed to Metalism Records, their albums are available with English titles, although the songs themselves are predominantly sung in Russian. In 2007, for the first time, the band was able to perform outside of Russia, touring Ukraine, Belarus, Slovakia and the Czech Republic, where they were warmly received.

== History ==
=== 1996–1999 ===
Andrey Losev (Elk), a bass guitarist who had previously performed in Mourning Beads, Molestation, and Canonis, founded the band Alkonost in August 1996.

=== 2000–2004 ===
On January 26, 2000, the band presented their debut full-length album, “Songs of the Eternal Oak”, which was released on audio cassettes in May by the Latvian label Beverina Productions and the German Ketzer Records. After that Alkonost played some shows, including “Death Panorama 9” and a festival in Ulyanovsk. However, due to numerous technical problems, the band had to stop playing live since October 2000. On July 31, 2002, through the efforts of Beverina Productions and Ketzer Records, the Alkonost CD was released, consisting of an album “Songs of the Eternal Oak”, a demo “Spirit Tending to Revolt”, as well as two video clips.

=== 2005–2007 ===
In 2005, the band toured a lot. However, at the same time, Alkonost was overtaken by problems - the planned album “Mezhmirie” (Russian version of “Between the Worlds”) did not come out, and the band's manager D. V. Tyunev had resigned. After these events, the band began to record the upcoming album “Pout' Neproydenny” (The Path We've Never Made) (CDM-Records studio). Thus, in 2006, their new label, Metalism Records, issued both albums, the old “Between the Worlds” and the new “The Path We've Never Made”.

After finishing the tour, the band prepared to record new songs, simultaneously re-recording their debut album “Songs of the Eternal Oak” with Russian lyrics. In 2007, Alkonost played the shows together with Master, as well as with Znich at the folk metal music festival in Minsk.

=== 2008–2009 ===
In 2008, the band went on tour in Russia and in April 2009 - in Europe (Poland, Slovenia, Holland, Germany, Slovakia, Czech Republic), where it performed at Ragnarok fest, held in Germany from April 17 to 18.

=== 2010–2013 ===
In 2010, the new album “Na Kryliakh Zova” (On the Wings of the Call) was released by the German label “Einheit Produktionen”. Alexey Solovyov left the band. Alkonost focused on recording the next studio album, occasionally giving single performances in Russia and Ukraine.

In 2011–2012, Almira Fatkhullina, Alyona Pelevina, Anton Chepigin and session bassist/vocalist Vladimir Pavlik left the band. In 2012, Ksenia Pobuzhanskaya (vocals) and Maxim Shtanke (vocals/bass guitar) joined the band, and with this updated line-up Alkonost returned to active touring. In 2012, the band continued touring and participated in such large-scale events as: Moto-Maloyaroslavets, Invasion, Fire Fest festivals and Carpathian Alliance Metal Festival (UA). Then Alkonost went on a short tour around the cities of Ukraine.

=== 2013–2015 ===
2013 was marked by the release of a new album “Skazki Stranstviy” (Tales of Wanderings) and a big tour to support it. In 2015, Maxim Shtanke and Dmitry Sokolov left the band. They were temporarily replaced by Vitold "Vitold" Buznayev (bass guitar, vocals) and Danila Pereladov (guitar).

=== 2016–present ===
In the early summer of 2016, Latvian label Beverina reissued Alkonost's album “Kamennogo Serdtsa Krov'” (Stone Heart Blood) on a vinyl. In 2016, Rustem Shagitov joined the band as a bass guitarist and Pavel Kosolapov took the place of guitarist-vocalist.

On March 17, 2017, Alkonost had signed a three-year contract with Sleasly Rider Records label to release the album “Pesni Beloy Lilii” (Songs of the White Lily) on a CD for distribution in Europe. On April 1, 2018, Internet edition of the single “Listopad” (Leaf Fall) was released. End of February 2020 - March 2020. Alkonost did a Ural-Siberian tour from Ufa to Krasnoyarsk with session musicians: Ravil Nizametdinov - drums (Psychosis, Impact), Pavel Kosolapov - guitar. On November 13, 2020, the album "Alkonost - Piano version" was released. On January 21, 2021, the ninth full-length album "Vedomye Vetrom" (Driven by the Wind) is released.

== Members ==
=== Current members ===
- Andrey "Elk" Losev – guitar, music (1996–present)
- Ksenia Pobuzhanskaya – vocals (2012–present)
- Pavel Kosolapov – guitar, vocals (2016–2017, 2019–present)
- Vadim Grozov – bass (2021–present)

=== Live musicians ===
- Dmitriy Bortsov – drums (2023–present)

=== Former members ===
- Alexey "Alex Nightbird" Solovyov – bass, vocals (1996–2010)
- Alexey Polkhovskyi – guitar (1996)
- Sergey "Coocker" Medvedev – guitar (1997)
- Vladimir "VL" Lushin – drums (1998–2000; died 2019)
- Almira Fatkhullina – keyboards (1999–2011)
- Anton Chepigin – drums (2002–2014)
- Alyona Pasynkova (Pelevina) – vocals (2002–2011)
- Dmitry Sokolov – guitar (2003–2015)
- Max "Pain" Shtanke – bass, vocals (2012–2015), guitar (2019)
- Anastasiya Ryabova – drums (2014–2015)
- Rustem Shagitov – bass (2016–2021), guitar (2018–2021)

=== Former live members ===
- Irina Zybina – vocals (2009–2010)
- Vladimir Pavlik – bass, vocals (2010–2011)
- Vitold Buznaev – bass (2015–2016)
- Danila "Skorb" Pereladov – guitar (2015–2016)
- Dmitry "Fin" Fiskin – drums (2016-2017)
- Roman "Dolbezhnik" Davidenko – drums (2016-2017)
- Andrey Ischenko – drums (2017)
- Andrey "Panterich" Panteleev – guitar, vocals (2018–2019)
- Ilya Rakitin – drums (2019)
- Stepan "Beast" Maratkanov – guitar, vocals (2019–2019)
- Mark Kirichenko – drums (2018–2019)
- Riyaz Khafizov – drums (2019)
- Anton "Chekhov" Simonov – bass, vocals (2018, 2019–2020, 2021)
- Ravil Nizametdinov – drums (2020–2022)

== Discography ==
=== Studio albums ===
- Songs of Eternal Oak (2000, Beverina Productions / Ketzer Records)
- Between the Worlds (2004, MetalAgen Records / Soyuz Music / Vic Records)
- Межмирье (2006, Metalism Records)
- Путь Непройденный (The Path We've Never Made) (2006, Metalism Records / Vic Records)
- Каменного Сердца Кровь (Blood of a Stone Heart) (2007, Metalism Records / Beverina Productions / MetalAgen Records)
- Песни Вечного Древа (2007, Metalism Records)
- На Крыльях Зова (On the Wings of the Call) (2010, Einheit Produktionen / Sound Age Productions)
- Сказки Странствий (Tales of Wanderings) (2013, Sound Age Productions / Beverina Productions)
- Песни Белой Лилии (Songs of the White Lily) (2016, Black Death Production / Art of the Night Productions)
- Октаграмма (Octagram) (2018, self-released)
- Piano Version (2020, self-released)
- Ведомые Ветром (Driven by the Wind) (2021, self-released)

=== Compilation albums ===
- Alkonost (2002, Beverina Productions / Ketzer Records / MetalAgen Records / Soyuz Music)
- Full Discography (2019, self-released)

=== Demos and EPs ===
- Shadows of Timeless (1997, self-released)
- Shadows of Glory (1997, self-released)
- Spirit Tending to Revolt (unreleased) (2001)
- Неведомые земли (Unknown Lands) (2001, self-released)
- Memories (compilation) (2001)
- Русалка (2014, Beverina Productions)
- Тропа K Bесне (2017, Beverina Productions)

=== DVDs ===
- У стен Арконы (In Front of the Arkona Walls) (2008, Sound Age Productions)
- Live in Moscow (split with Månegarm and Kalevala) (2008)
