= Aidar Metshin =

Russian politician

Aidar Metshin MP
- Айдар Метшин
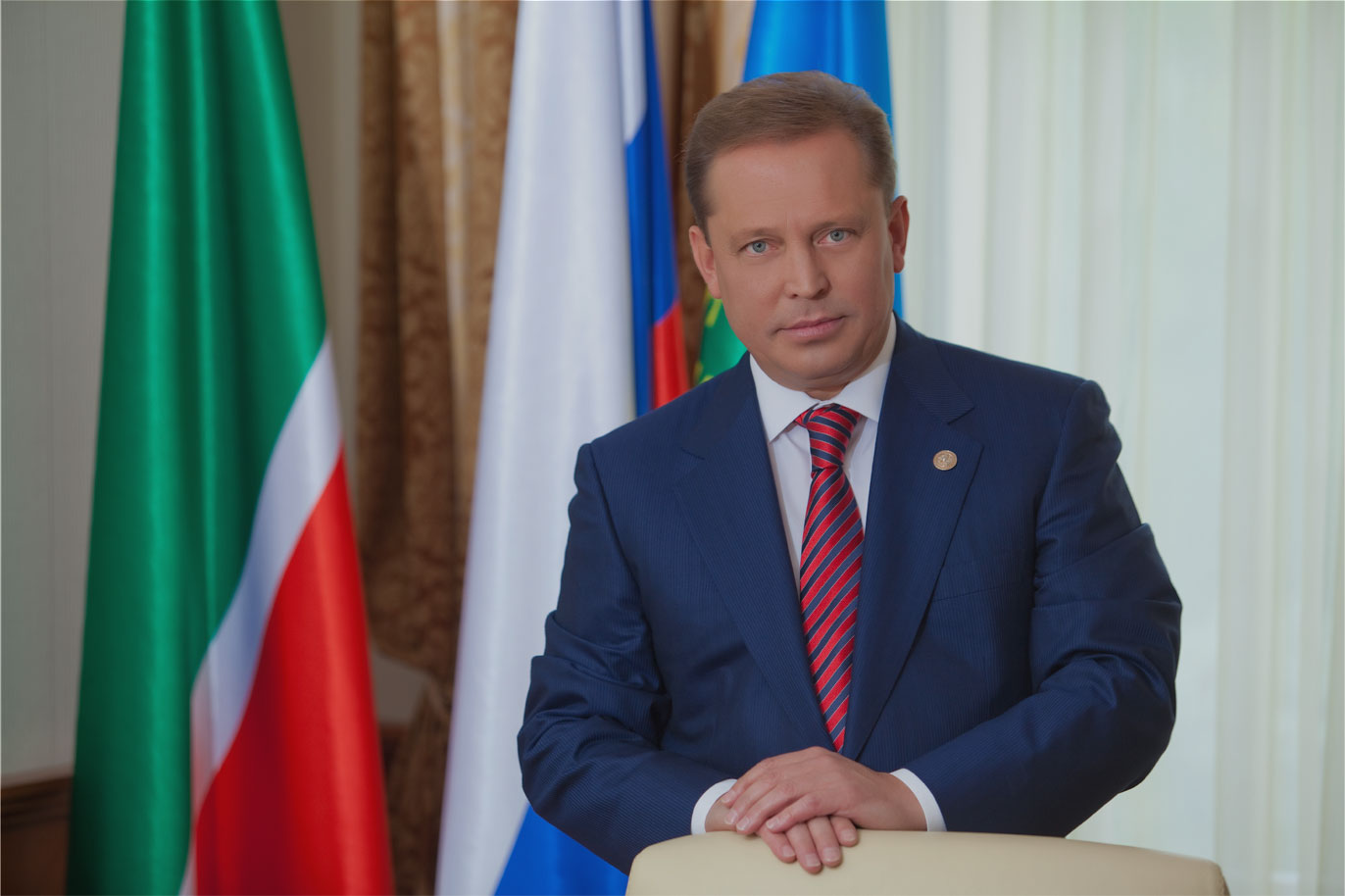

Member of the State Duma (Party List Seat)
- Incumbent
- Assumed office 12 October 2021

Personal details
- Born: 27 August 1963 (age 62) Naberezhnye Chelny, Tatar ASSR, RSFSR, USSR
- Party: United Russia
- Education: Kazan Chemical Technology Institute; Kazan State University; Academy of Labour and Social Relations

Aidar Raisovich Metshin (Russian: Айдар Раисович Метшин; born 27 August 1963) is a Russian political figure, former mayor of Nizhnekamsk, and a deputy of the 8th State Duma.

In 1999, Metshin was elected deputy of the Nizhnekamsk United Council of People's Deputies. From 2000 to 2006, he was the administrative director of the Nizhnekamsk Oil Refinery. He left the post to head the Nizhnekamsky District. From 2008 to 2021, he was also the deputy of the City Council and served as a mayor of Nizhnekamsk (re-elected for the post in 2010, 2015, and 2020). Since September 2021, he has served as the deputy of the 8th State Duma.

In 2024, Metshin was in the crowd during the Crocus City Hall attack.

== Sanctions ==
He is one of the members of the State Duma the United States Treasury sanctioned on 24 March 2022 in response to the 2022 Russian invasion of Ukraine.

He was anctioned by the UK government in 2022 in relation to the Russo-Ukrainian War.
