= Kalevala (disambiguation) =

The Kalevala is the Finnish national epic poem.

Kalevala may also refer to:

== Places ==
=== Europe ===
- Kalevala, Russia, an urban-type settlement in the Republic of Karelia, Russia
- Kalevalsky District (Karelian: Kalevalan piiri), an administrative district raion in the Republic of Karelia
- Kalevala, a district of Kuhmo

=== North America ===
- Kalevala Township, Minnesota, a civil township in Minnesota, U.S.

== Arts, entertainment, and media ==
- Kalevala (band), a Russian folk metal band
- Kalevala (comic), a comic adaptation of the epic poem by Sami Makkonen
- Kalevala meter, the poetic meter used in the Kalevala and the Kalevipoeg epic poems
- Kalevala, a 2013 film
- Kalevala Knights, a Washington-based biker gang featured in the 2023 video game Alan Wake 2
- Kalevala, a planet in the Mandalore System, from the Star Wars television series The Mandalorian

== Brands and enterprises ==
- Kalevala, a Finnish gin
- Kalevala, a Finnish jewelry brand

== Transportation ==
- Kalevala (corvette), an 1858 flagship of the Finnish naval equipage

== Other uses ==
- Kalevala Sport, a volleyball team from Kajaani
- 1454 Kalevala, an asteroid
- Kalevala Village, a tourist attraction in Kuhmo
- Kalevala Grade School, a school in Minnesota, USA
- Kalevala School, a former school in Kuopio, Finland (until 2016)
- Kalevala Society, a Finnish scientific and artistic society founded in 1911
