= Tukayevsky District =

Tukayevsky District Тукаевский район (Russian)
- District

Other transcription(s)
  - Tatar: Тукай районы
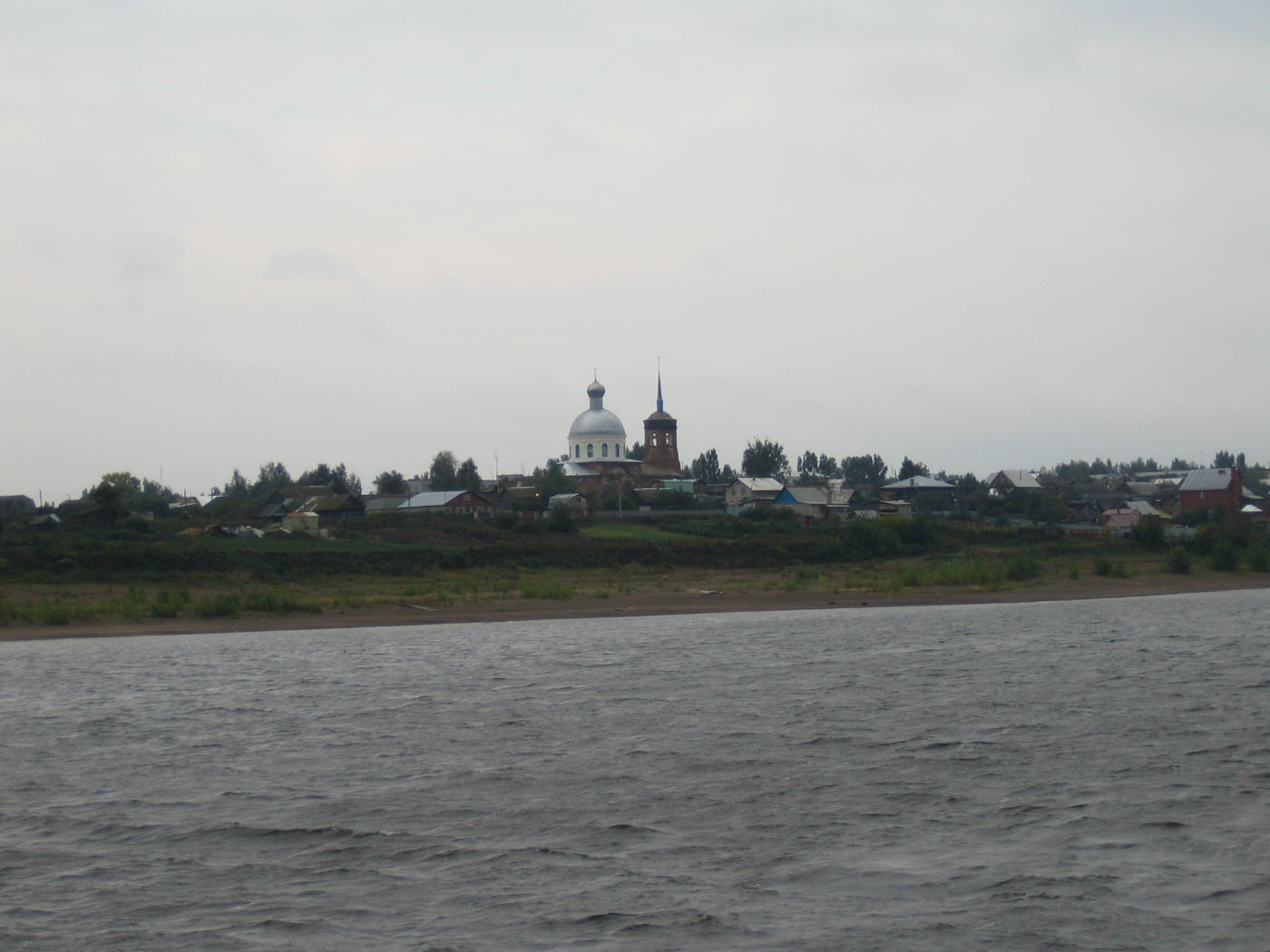
- Betky, Tukayevsky District

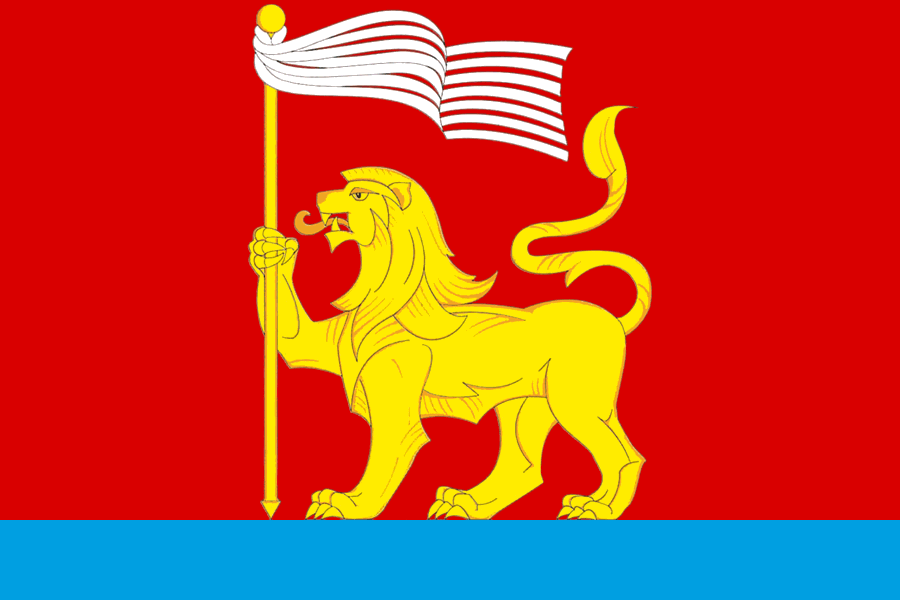
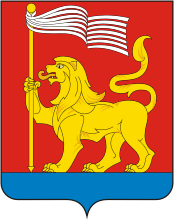
- Flag Coat of arms
- Location of Tukayevsky District in the Republic of Tatarstan
- Coordinates: 55°38′N 52°27′E
- Country: Russia
- Federal subject: Republic of Tatarstan
- Established: 1930
- Administrative center: Naberezhnye Chelny

Area
  - Total: 1,744 km^{2} (673 sq mi)

Population (2010 Census)
  - Total: 36,561
  - Density: 20.96/km^{2} (54.30/sq mi)
  - Urban: 0%
  - Rural: 100%

Administrative structure
  - Inhabited localities: 88 rural localities

Municipal structure
  - Municipally incorporated as: Tukayevsky Municipal District
  - Municipal divisions: 0 urban settlements, 23 rural settlements
- Time zone: UTC+3 (MSK)
- OKTMO ID: 92657000
- Website: http://tukay.tatarstan.ru/

Tukayevsky District (Russian: Тукаевский райо́н; Tatar: Тукай районы) is a territorial administrative unit and municipal district of the Republic of Tatarstan within the Russian Federation. The administrative center is Naberezhnye Chelny, but the city itself is not included as a part of the district. As of 2020, the population in the district was estimated at 42,511 people.

Tukayevsky district is a leader among the municipal districts of Tatarstan in the spheres of population welfare and economic development. Based on 2019 ratings of socio-economic development among municipalities in Tatarstan, Tukaevsky district took the fifth place. As of 2020, it ranked was among the top-three in the republic. The growth rate of gross regional product (GRP) was 106.9%, and its volume of economic activity estimated at 42.9 billion rubles. The region has well-developed industrial and agricultural sectors. The largest enterprises in the region include Chelny-Broiler, Kamsky Bekon, Naberezhnye Chelninsky elevator and the Naberezhnye Chelninsky bakery plant (Chelnykhleboprodukt).

One of the first of five regional territories for priority socio-economic development started operations in Naberezhnye Chelny in 2016.

== Geography ==
The total area of the Tukaevsky district is 172,949 hectares, of which forested areas cover more than 20.6 thousand hectares. The region is located in the north-eastern part of the republic. Tukaevsky borders the Mendeleyevsky District, Agryzsky District, Yelabuzhsky District, Nizhnekamsky District, Zainsky District, Sarmanovsky District and Menzelinsky District. As of 2020, the population of the district was 42,511 people.

== Coat of arms ==
Symbols on the coat of arms and flag indicate the role of the region in the socio-economic development of Tatarstan. The main figure is the golden lion, representing strength, power, confidence and courage. The shaft and seven silver tassels symbolize the friendship of the multinational population, which are united by the traditional Sabantuy holiday. The blue tip of the coat of arms indicates the geographical position of the region along the Kama. Gold is a symbol of wealth, stability, respect and intelligence, while silver signifies purity, perfection, peace, understanding.

== History ==
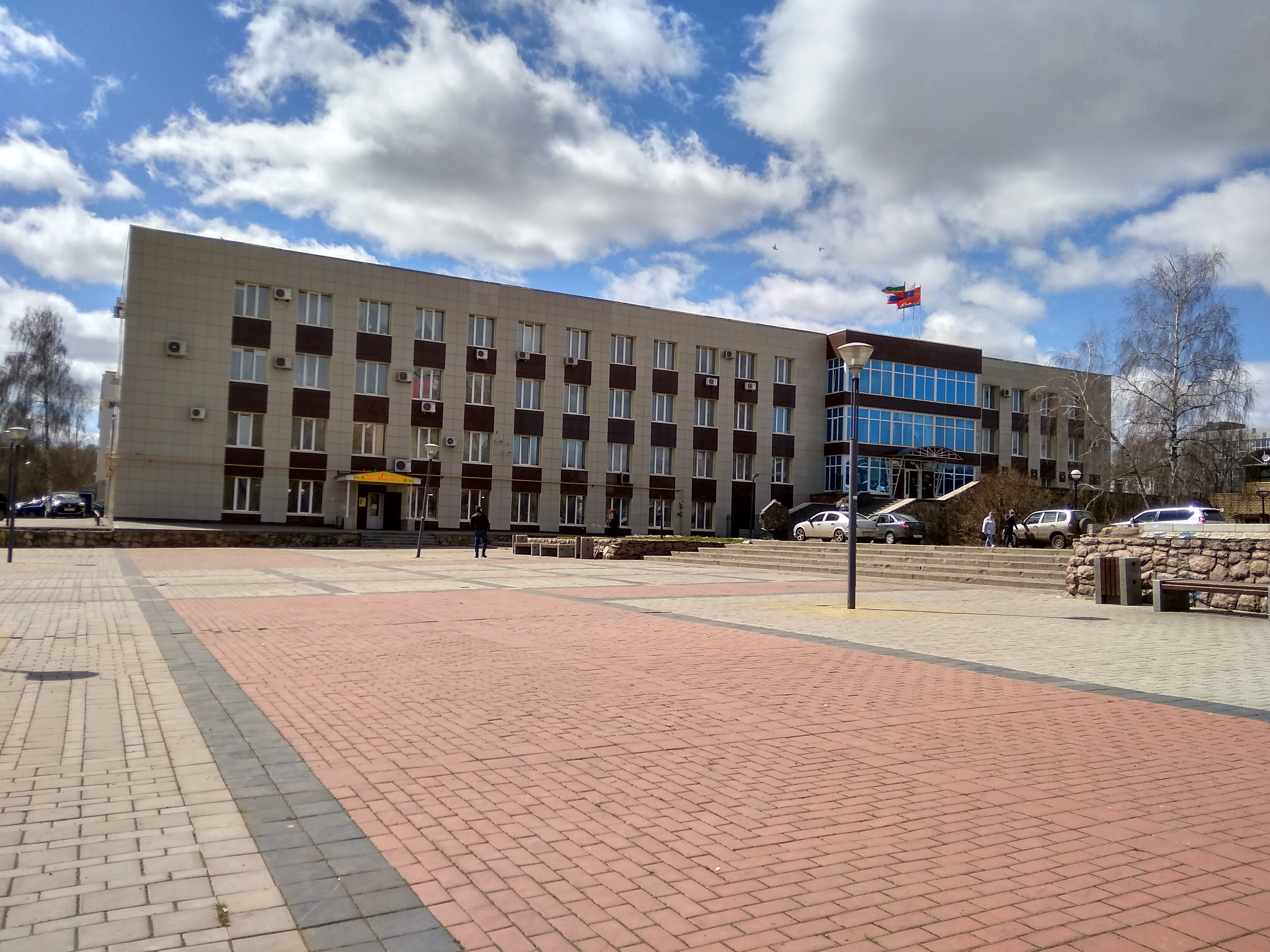
District administration building

Settlements first appeared on the territory of the modern Tukayevsky region in the third millennium BC. In the second half of the XIV century, the land was a part of Volga Bulgaria.

The Tukayevsky district was created in 1930 as Naberezhnye Chelninsky in honor of the administrative center of Naberezhnye Chelny. The word “chelny” comes from the transliteration of the Turkic word “chaly” (mountain, slope or bare hill) into the Russian “cheln” (boat). Until 1920, the territory of the Tukayevsky district was part of the Menzelinsky uyezd of the Ufa Governorate. In 1920 the district became part of the newly formed Tatar Autonomous Soviet Socialist Republic. In 1976 the district was renamed to Tukaevsky.

From 2006 to 2010 the district was headed by Tagir Harmatullin, followed from 2010 to 2017 by Vasil Khazeev. In 2018, Khazeev and the head of the executive committee Rasim Asylgarayev were accused of fraud which lead to a criminal investigation. Khazeev and Asylgarayev were accused of having illegally leased 11 hectares of pine forest land to private individuals. Fail Kamaev was subsequently appointed as head of the district.

== Population ==
Tatars make up 71.07% of the total population of the district, while Russians constitute around 24.26% and Chuvash make up the remaining 1.48%. As of 2020, the population of the district was 42,511 persons.

== Municipal-territorial structure ==
There are 88 settlements in Tukayevsky district grouped into 23 rural settlements.

== Economy ==
=== State of the Economy ===
Tukayevsky district occupies a leading position in the spheres of population welfare and economic development among rural districts of Tatarstan with low levels of urbanization. In 2019, the Tukayevsky district ranked fifth in the socio-economic development rankings of districts in Tatarstan. The growth rate of the gross regional product of the region increased by 106.9% in 2019 while the volume of goods produced amounted to 42.9 billion rubles. Cash expenditures per capita in 2020 were equivalent to 24 thousand rubles a month, and the average monthly salary was 33 thousand rubles. In 2020, the Tukaevsky district entered the ranks of the three most economically developed regions of Tatarstan.

The unemployment rate in the district is 0.47%, which is below the national average of 0.53%. About half of the able-bodied population of the region are employed in small and medium-sized enterprises. In total, 2597 enterprises are registered in the Tukayevsky region, with 28.9% of these participating in the region's high-tech industry. In January-March 2020, the revenues of small and medium-sized businesses in the district amounted to 10 billion rubles. Of these enterprises, 8.2% are engaged in trade, 13.5% in manufacturing, 12.8% are engaged in construction and 10.8% work in the transportation sector.

=== Industry ===
The region has a well developed industrial sector. In 2019, local enterprises shipped products with a total value of 34.1 billion rubles, contributing to an industrial production index of 101.5%. The largest enterprises in the Tukayevsky district include Chelny-Broiler (revenue 8.6 billion rubles), Kamsky Bacon (revenue 5.6 billion rubles), the Naberezhnye Chelninsky elevator (revenue 5.13 billion rubles) and the Naberezhnye Chelninsky plant of bread products (Chelnykhleboprodukt) (revenue 3.5 billion rubles)..

One of the largest enterprises in the district is the Naberezhnye Chelninsky Reinforced Concrete Plant Melioration which was founded in 1976 and now has a design capacity of 60 thousand m³ of reinforced concrete products per year. Chelnykhleboprodukt is one of the largest agro-industrial enterprises of the republic, which includes a grain elevator for storing 95 thousand tons of grain, two mills as well as feed and cereal factories. The activities of the Naberezhnye Chelninsky Elevator are include the receiving, storing, drying and processing grain and oilseeds, as well as the production of cereals.

=== Agriculture ===
Agricultural lands of the district occupy 119.3 thousand hectares. Local farmers cultivate spring wheat, winter rye, oats, potatoes, and vegetables. The leading livestock industries in the Tukayevsky region are dairy and meat cattle breeding, pig breeding and poultry farming. Thanks to its developed agricultural sector, the district provides Naberezhnye Chelny with bread, vegetables, meat, milk, and potatoes. The largest agricultural enterprises of the Tukayevsky region are the poultry farms "Tukayevskaya", "Chelninskaya poultry farm", "Chelny-Broiler", "Chelny-myasa" and others. There is also a hog farm in the region, "Kamsky Bacon" with a selection and hybrid center, which provides breeding animals for pig farms in the Republic of Tatarstan, the Volga and Ural federal districts. In the first months of 2020, 46.6 thousand tons of pork were produced in the region. As of 2020, the annual milk production of the region was 15.25 thousand tons.

According to various indicators, agricultural workers of the Tukayevsky district have the highest salary compared to workers in other municipalities of Tatarstan. Workers receive a salary of on average 38,510 rubles. The year of 2019 in the Tukaevsky district was declared as the year of support for personal subsidiary plots. During that time, 14 mini-farms were built in the district.

=== Investment potential ===
Fixed capital investment in the district amounted to more than 10 billion in 2019, of which Kamsky Bacon invested 856.8 million, Agrosila more than 400 million, Chelnykhleboprodukt 45 million, and Begishevo airport 239.5 million. In 2019, the district adopted a new strategy for socio-economic development, according to which there are plans to increase the GDP by 50% by 2030 (from 40.4 billion to 58.9 billion), as well as create more than 500 new jobs. Large investment programs are of great importance to this project. These included the construction of the Musabay broiler feedlot with a capacity to produce 96 thousand tons of poultry meat per year, the creation of an industrial park in the Biklyansky rural settlement of 85 hectares, as well as the construction of a grain elevator complex with a capacity of 60 thousand tons at Chelnykhleboprodukt.

One of the first five regional territories of priority socio-economic development began operating in Naberezhnye Chelny in 2016. As of 2020 the economic zone had 44 resident enterprises providing 6,000 jobs in the district.

One of the largest investment projects in the region is the reconstruction of the Begishevo Airport complex. In 2017, the construction of an international terminal began which will increase the throughput capacity of the airport from 60 to 200 people per hour. In 2020, there are plans to commission a three-story terminal building with the cost of the terminal amounting to 25 million rubles out of an estimated reconstruction project total of 1.132 billion rubles.

=== Transport ===
The administrative center of the district, Naberezhnye Chelny, is located in the northeast of Tatarstan. The region has a large river port and a passenger pier on the left bank of the Kama River. The river flows to the Caspian Sea, Sea of Azov, Black Sea, White Sea and Baltic Sea. There is a large junction of highways in the district with routes from Naberezhnye Chelny to Yelabuga, Kazan, Nizhnekamsk, Zainsk-Almetyevsk and Sarmanovo-Menzelinsk. The main communications between Predkamye of Tatarstan and Zakamye cross along the crest of the dam of the Nizhnekamsk Hydroelectric Station. The federal highway M-7 "Volga", "Samara - Izhevsk" passes through the region. Railway communications are accessed via a branch of the Kuybyshev Railway. There is also the "Begishevo" international airport in the region.

== Ecology ==
Tukayevsky district is located within a coal basin; however, coal is not mined due to the significant depth of the seams and their frequent flooding. There are peat deposits near the settlements of Ilbukhtino, Tlyanche-Tamak, Kuzkeevo. About 12% of the region's territory are covered by forests with the most common species being oak, linden, birch, aspen, spruce, pine.

In January 2019, it was revealed that local authorities had approved a project to change the channel of the Shilna River in order to prevent the flooding of the village called Bolshaya Shilna. The project caused a public outcry among local environmentalists and activists, who appealed to the head of the Ministry of Ecology of the Republic, Alexander Shadrikov with an open letter, asking him to provide data from environmental experts on the advisability of changing the river bed.

== Social sphere ==
There are 23 rural palaces of culture, 32 rural clubs, a children's art school and two auto clubs in the region. There are also 13 amateur folk groups in the region. In 2020, a Kryashens church was opened in the region conducting services in the Tatar language.

There are more than 120 monuments of history, culture, architecture in the region, including the Church of Kosma and Damian and the Church of the Ascension, "Borovets Springs".

In 2020 a universal sports complex "Alga" was opened in the village of Nizhny Suyk-Su.
