= Nizhnekamsky District =

Nizhnekamsky District Нижнекамский район (Russian)
- District

Other transcription(s)
  - Tatar: Түбән Кама районы
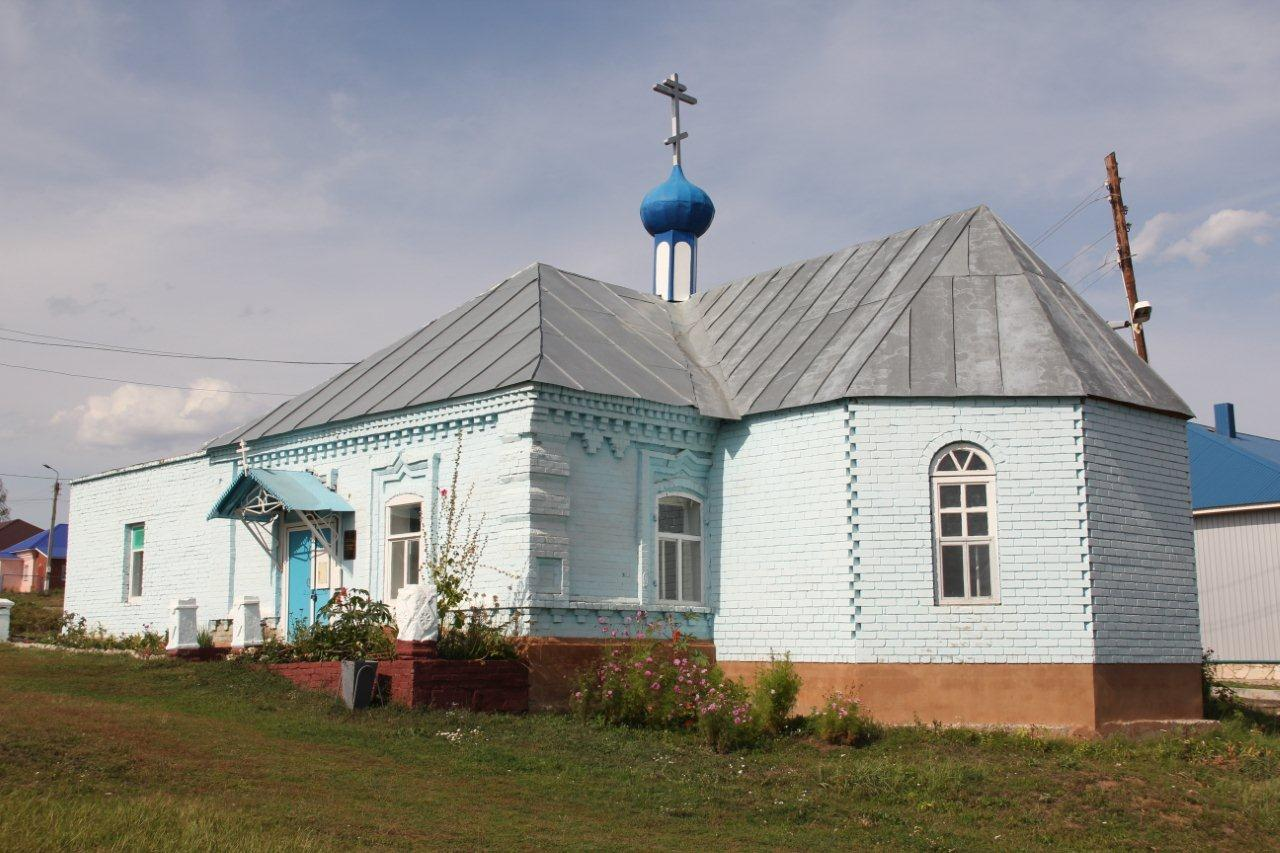
- Church in Sheremetevka, Nizhnekamsky District

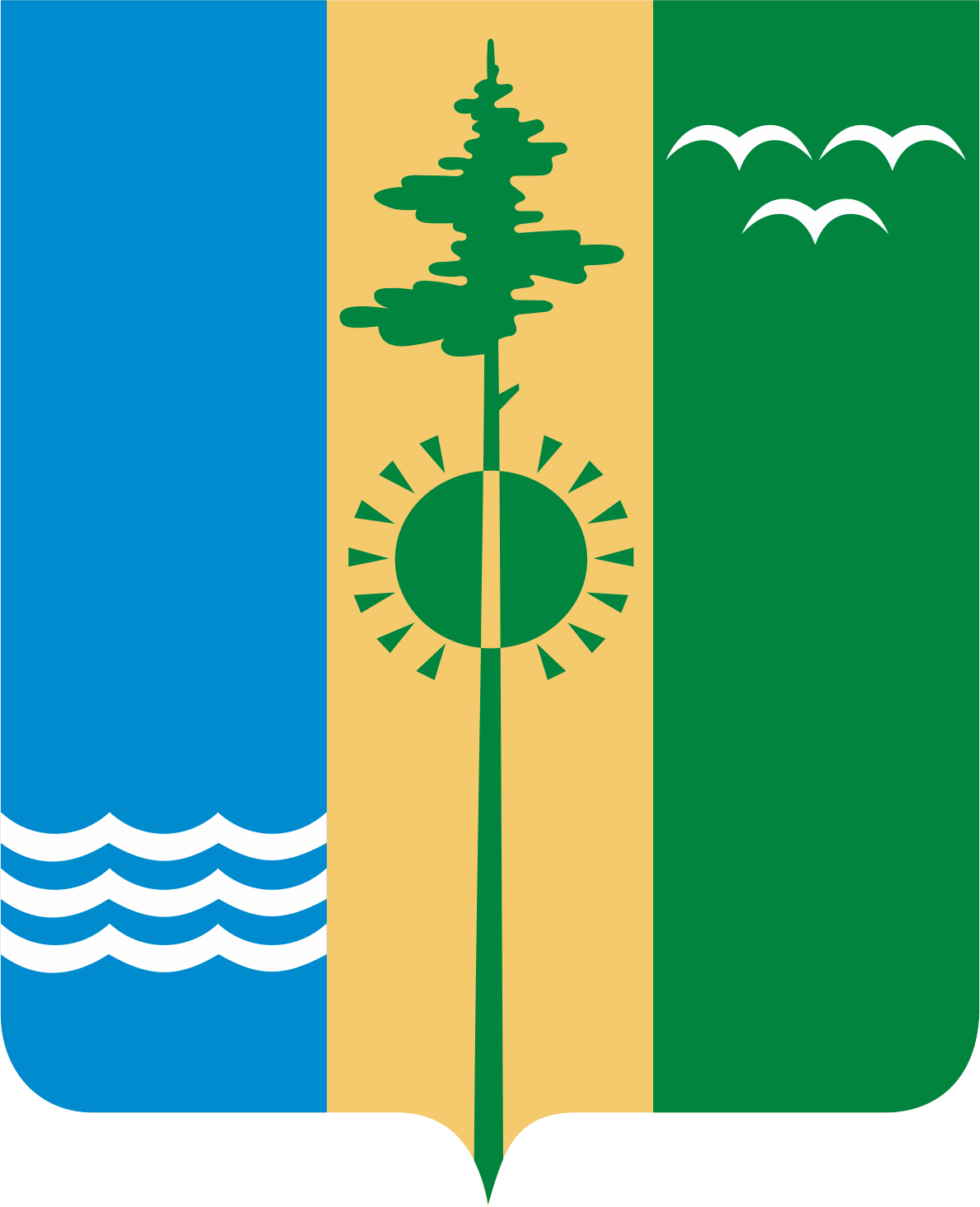
- Flag Coat of arms
- Location of Nizhnekamsky District in the Republic of Tatarstan
- Coordinates: 55°24′51″N 51°48′10″E
- Country: Russia
- Federal subject: Republic of Tatarstan
- Established: 12 January 1965
- Administrative center: Nizhnekamsk

Area
  - Total: 1,672.3 km^{2} (645.7 sq mi)

Population (2010 Census)
  - Total: 37,860
  - Density: 22.64/km^{2} (58.64/sq mi)
  - Urban: 41.7%
  - Rural: 58.3%

Administrative structure
  - Inhabited localities: 1 urban-type settlements, 61 rural localities

Municipal structure
  - Municipally incorporated as: Nizhnekamsky Municipal District
  - Municipal divisions: 2 urban settlements, 15 rural settlements
- Time zone: UTC+3 (MSK)
- OKTMO ID: 92644000
- Website: http://e-nkama.ru/

Nizhnekamsky District (Russian: Нижнека́мский райо́н; Tatar: Түбән Кама районы) is a territorial administrative unit and municipal district of the Republic of Tatarstan within the Russian Federation. The district is located on the left bank of the Kama River. The administrative center of the district is Nizhnekamsk and the population of the district was 276,326 at the beginning of 2020.

The first mention of a settlement on the territory of the modern Nizhnekamsky district dates back to the 17th century while the modern Nizhnekamsky district was formed in 1965 by allocating land from the Tukayevsky District.

The Nizhnekamsky district is one of the key oil refining territories of Tatarstan. The regional center is the city of Nizhnekamsk which achieved TASED status (Territory of Advanced Social-Economic Development) in 2017.

== Geography ==
The Nizhnekamsky district is located in the bend of the Kama river. It borders the Yelabuzhsky District and Mamadyshsky District to the North, and the Tukayevsky District to the east. The district shares a border with the Almetyevsky District on the southeast and with Novosheshminskiy district on the southwest. In the west, the district borders the Chistopolsky District. The total land area of the Nizhnekamsky district is 123 thousand hectares, 6153 hectares of which lie in the city of Nizhnekamsk. There are 65 rural settlements in the region.

A significant part of the region's borders in the north and west runs along natural water barriers (the Kama River and the Kuybyshev Reservoir). Large rivers of the region are Sheshma, Zay, Kichuy and the Uratma.

== Coat of arms and flag ==
The Council of the Municipal Formation of the Nizhnekamsky district approved the modern coat of arms and flag on June 9, 2006. The coat of arms uses three colors. The green color is a symbol of nature and health. Gold is a symbol of harvest, wealth, stability, respect, and intelligence. Blue is a symbol of honor. Silver waves represent the Kama river, which gave the name to the city. The pine tree and the sun symbolize the favorable natural conditions for life in the area. Flying birds also symbolize spiritual uplift, energy, and creativity. The flag of the Nizhnekamsky Municipal District is a rectangular cloth, vertically divided into three stripes of the same colors.

== History ==
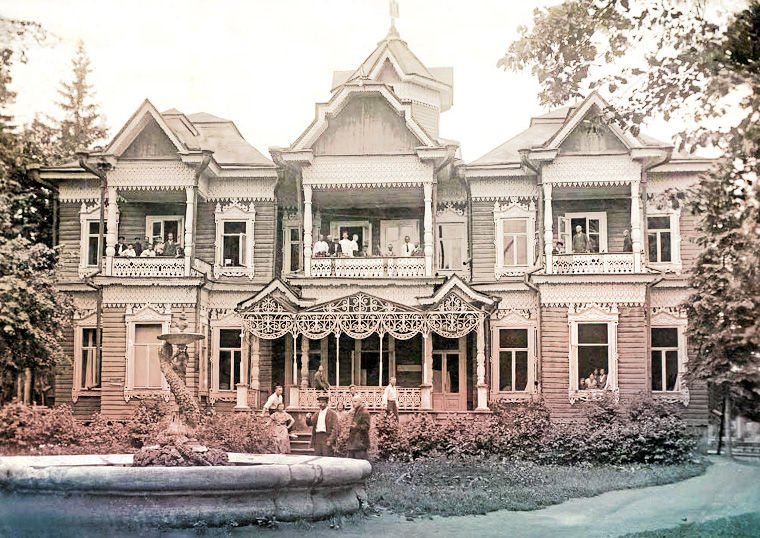
Dacha of the Stakheevs in the village of Krasny Klyuch

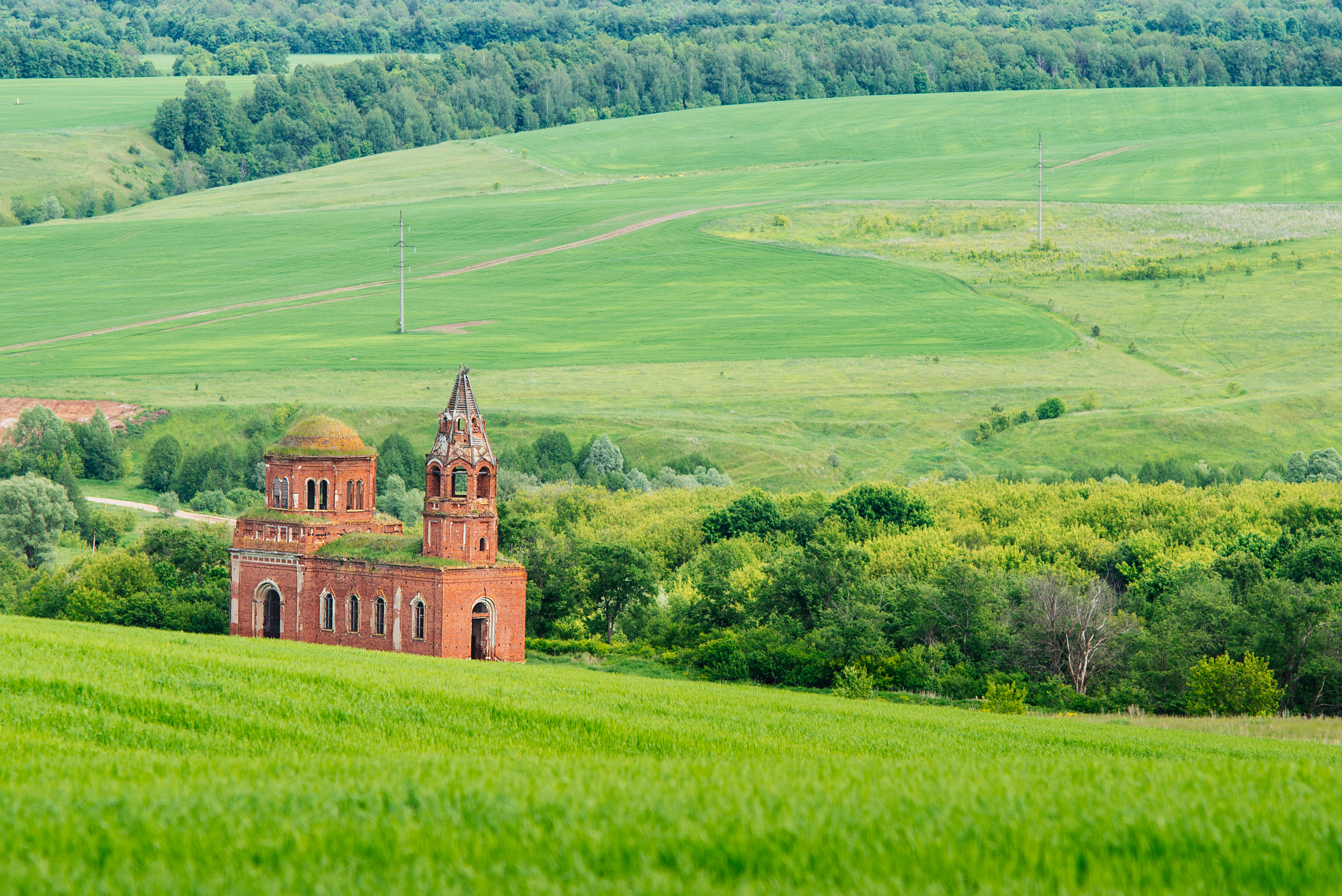
Temple of the Presentation of the Lord in the village of Popovka

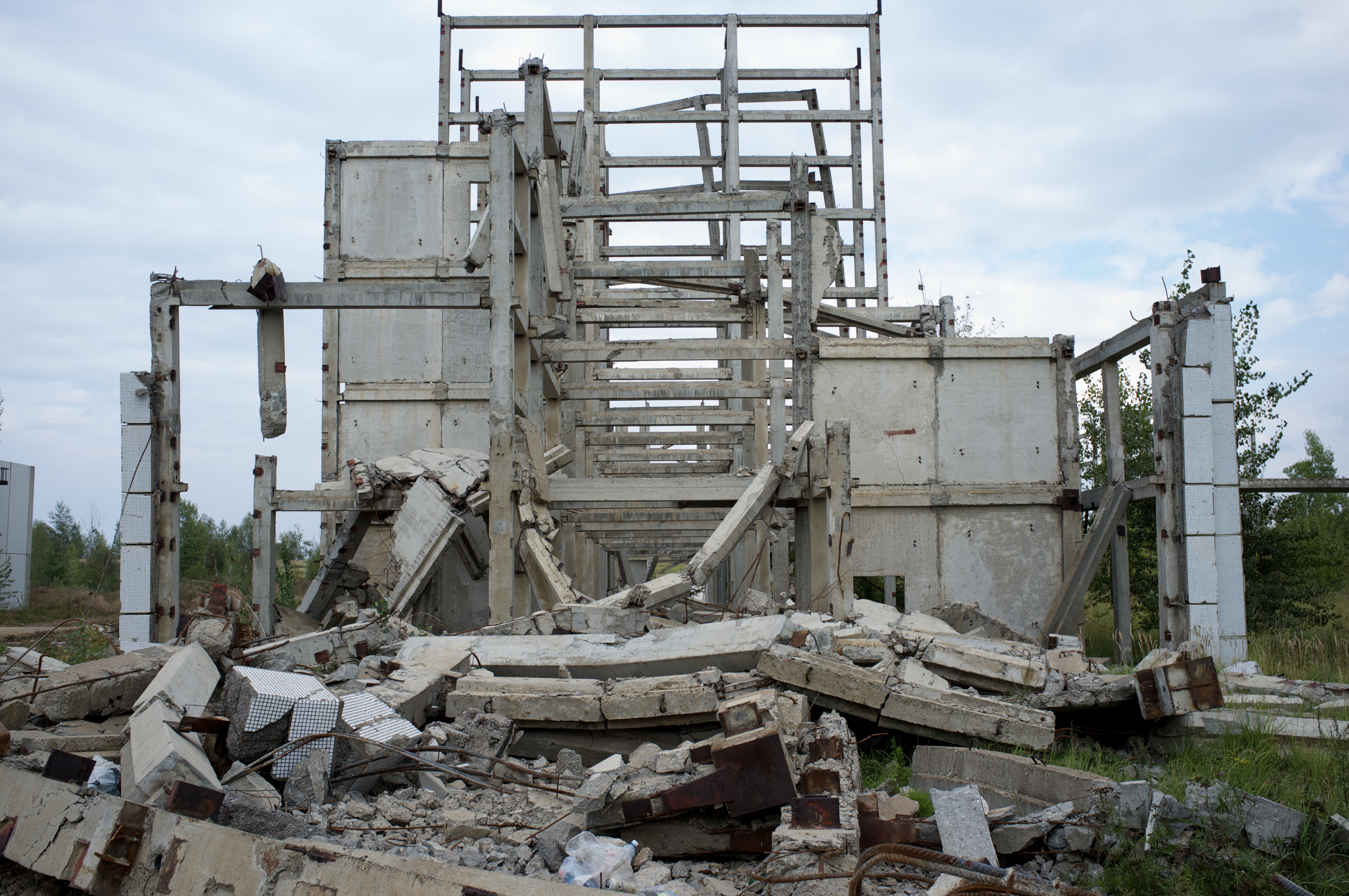
Unfinished nuclear power plant

The first settlements established on the territory of the modern Nizhnekamsky district date back to the 17th century. During this period, the village of Bogorodskoye (now Sheremetyevka), the city of Starosheshminsk, the villages of Karmal, Gorodishche, Elantovo, Kulmaksa, and Lower Uratma were built. The settlements of Nizhneye Afanasovo, Achi, Smylovka, Simenevo, Verkhniye Chelny were formed in the 18th century. The main part of the modern Nizhnekamsky district was part of the Menzelinsky district of the Ufa Governorate.

The Soviet government introduced the concept of cantons in the 1920s. The western part of the lands of the modern Nizhnekamsky district with some villages was part of the Chistopolsky canton. The Tatar Autonomous Soviet Socialist Republic had been importing oil products from neighboring republics until the 1950s. It was decided to create its own petrochemical production after the discovery of oil fields in the mid-1950s. The settlement of Afanasovo was named Nizhnekamsky on April 19, 1961. At that time, the population was about 500 people. The Nizhnekamsky district was separated from Tukayevsky District on January 12, 1965. The working village of Nizhnekamsk was given the status of a city in 1966. The construction of a nuclear power plant and the city of Kamskiye Polyany began in the region in the 1980s. But the construction was stopped because of a conflict with environmentalists due to the Chernobyl disaster.

== Population ==
As of 276,326 people live in the Nizhnekamsky district. The average age of residents is 35 years. The city of Nizhnekamsk is the third-largest city in Tatarstan after Kazan and Naberezhnye Chelny.

== Municipal-territorial structure ==
Aidar Metshin has been the head of the Nizhnekamsky municipal district since 2006. The Executive Committee is headed by Ayrat Salavatov..

There are 2 urban and 15 rural settlements in the Nizhnekamsky municipal district, which include 65 settlements. The administrative centers are villages: Kamskiye Polyany, Bolshoye Afanasovo, Yelantovo, Kayenly, Karmaly, Verkhniye Chelny, Krasnyy Klyuch, Trudovoy, Verkhnyaya Uratma, Nizhnyaya Uratma, Prosti, Blagodatnaya, Starosheshminsk, Sukharevo, Sheremetyevka, Shingalchi and the city of Nizhnekamsk.

== Economy ==
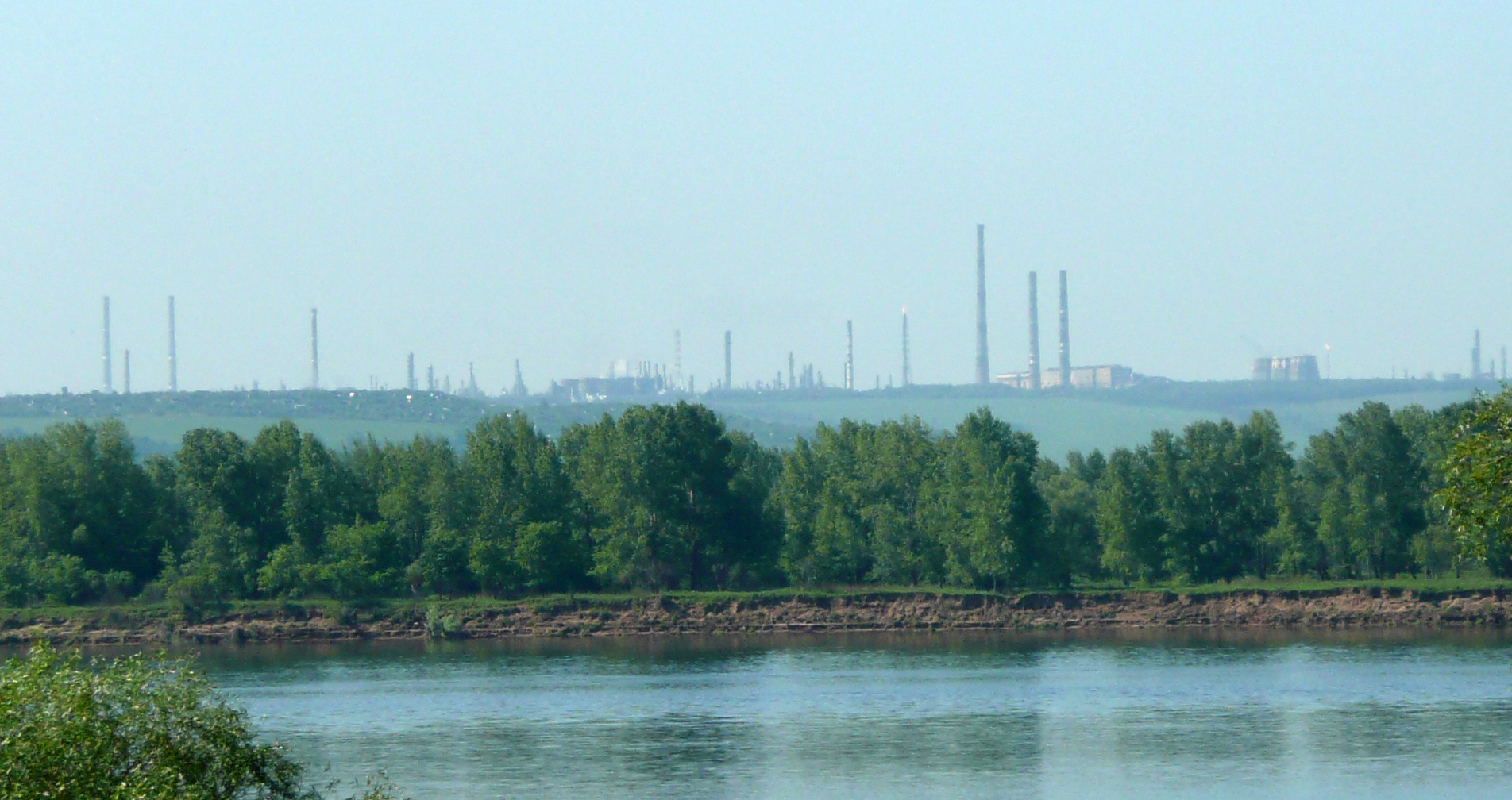
Nizhnekamsk from Elabuga side

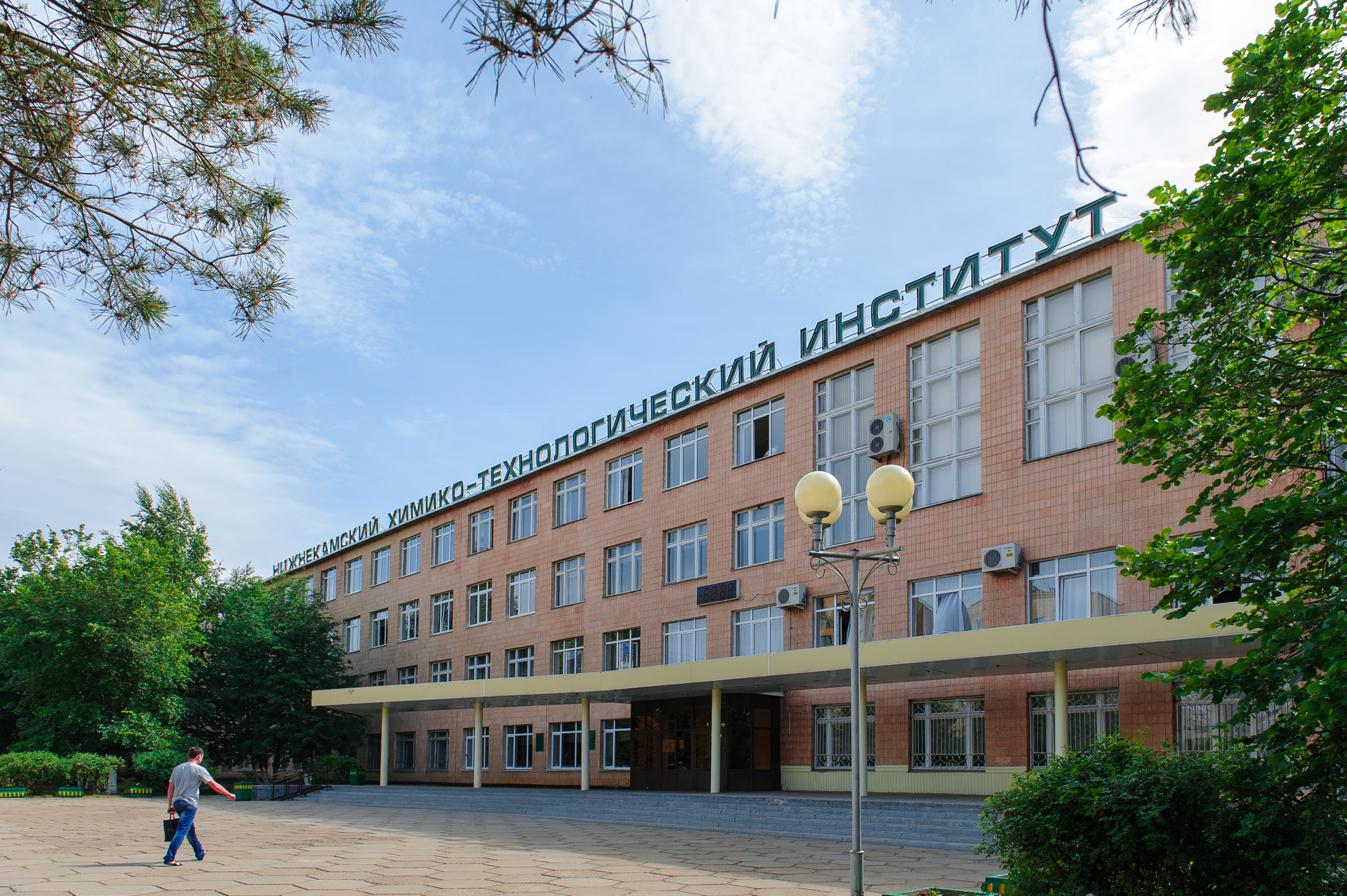
The main building of the NHTI

=== Foundation ===
Tatarstan gained economic sovereignty and began to pursue an independent regional economic policy in the 1990s. It was at this time that plans were conceived to create a complex that would combine oil production and petrochemical products in Tatarstan. A result of these plans was the "TAIF" complex created in Nizhnekamsk in 1997-2009, which included oil refineries, gasoline and gas condensate processing plants. Additionally, deep oil refining was carried out for the first time in the republic. The construction of a complex of "TANECO" plants began in Nizhnekamsk in 2005. The "Tatneft" holding became the main shareholder and project coordinator.

=== Industry ===
The Nizhnekamsky municipal district is the largest center of the petrochemical industry in Russia. It produces 23% of all industrial products in Tatarstan, amounting to about 30% of the region's exports. Nizhnekamsk contains 18% of the main production assets of the republic representing basic industries. Numerous oil refineries are located on the territory of the Nizhnekamsky district:

- “Nizhnekamskneftekhim” is the largest industrial complex of ten plants with a total production volume of 1.7 billion rubles per year. Annual tax payments to the budget of Nizhnekamsk are about 900 million rubles, a sum amounting to 70% of the annual city budget.
- “Nizhnekamskshina” is one of the largest tire manufacturing plants in Russia. Its volume of production amounted to 3.8 million units of products in the first half of 2020.
- "Nizhnekamsktekhuglerod" is the largest Russian enterprise for the production of carbon black. It is a part of the tire business block of the oil production company "Tatneft". The enterprise produced 112 thousand tons of carbon black and reported revenue of 21.2 million rubles in 2019.
- "Taif-NK" is a branch of "TAIF" holding. The company's revenue amounted to 207 billion rubles, and earned a net profit of 2.1 billion in 2019.

The association "Nizhnekamsk Industrial Circle" operates in the region. It was founded by four large enterprises: "Nizhnekamskneftekhim", "Tatneftekhiminvest Holding", "Association of Tatarstan Polymers Processors" and "Investment Agency of the City of Nizhnekamsk and Nizhnekamsky District". The main task of this association is to help the development of small and medium-sized enterprises engaged in the processing of polymer and petrochemical raw materials.

From January–September 2020 the district share of gross regional product amounted to 341,354,000,000 rubles.

=== Agriculture ===
The Nizhnekamsky municipal district is an agricultural region. The area of agricultural land under cultivation is 84,700 hectares in the district, of which arable land occupies 64,700 hectares according to data of 2017. Spring wheat, winter rye, barley, oats, potatoes, and vegetables are all cultivated in the region. The main forms of animal husbandry are meat and dairy cattle breeding, pig breeding and poultry farming.

Construction of the district's first meat processing plant started in the village of Kaenly in 2020. A planned volume of 20 tons of meat per day was announced along with 83 million rubles being allocated for construction.

The gross agricultural output of the region amounted to more than 1 billion rubles in January–June 2020.

=== Investment potential ===
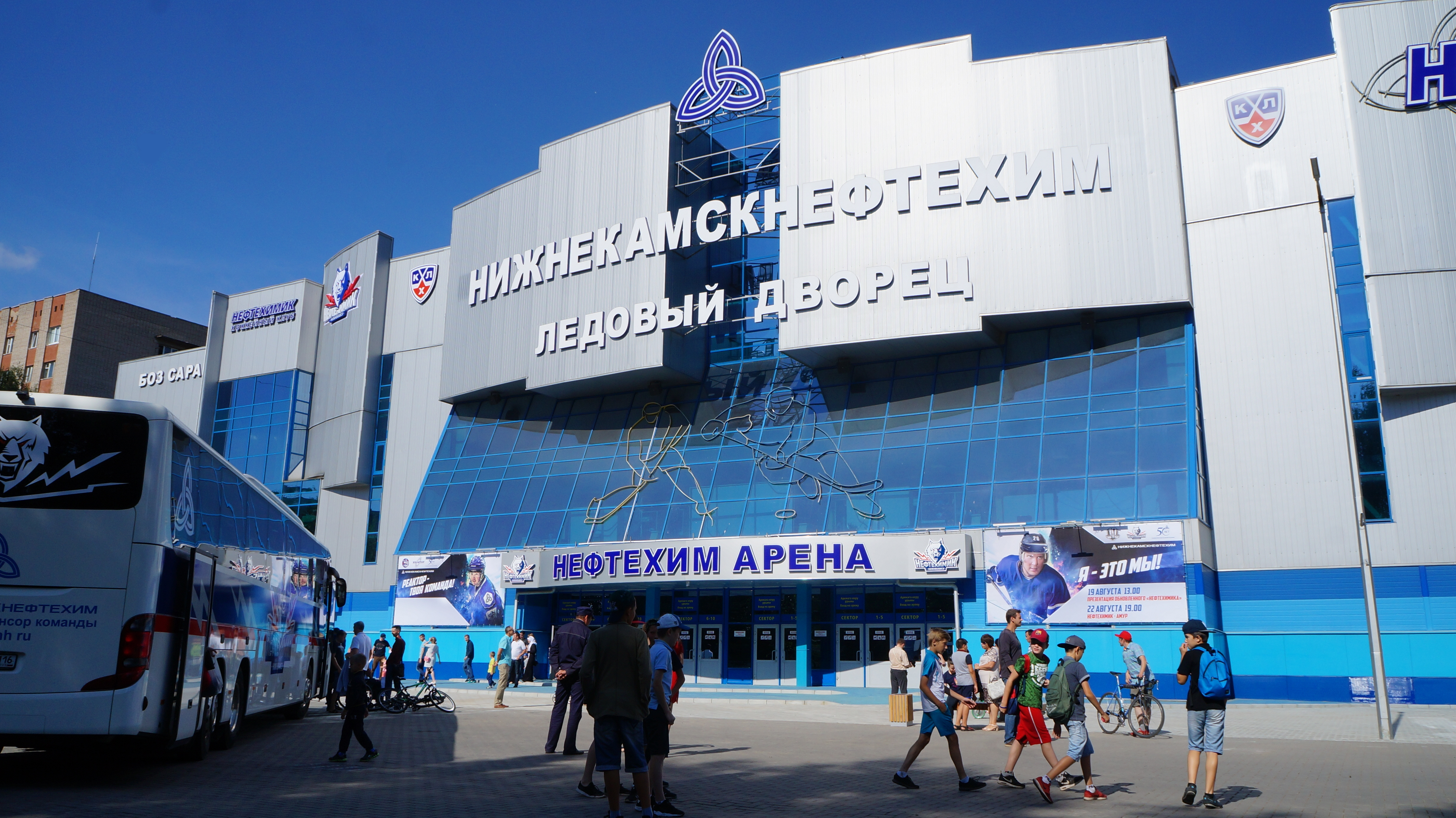
Ice Palace "Neftykhim Arena"

The territory of advanced social and economic development (TASED) was created in Nizhnekamsk by a decree of the Government of Russia signed by Dmitry Medvedev in December 2017. 12 companies established operations in the TASED in 2020. The ten-year development plan for TASED includes attracting investment in the amount of about 4.8 billion rubles.

There are three industrial parks in the Nizhnekamsky district. The occupants of the park share the costs of creating and maintaining external infrastructure. The territory of the park can be included in the TASED by the decision of local authorities. Otherwise, industrial parks are competitors of TSEDA for prospective occupants.

The industrial park "Kamskie Polyany" was created in 2008 on the territory of the urban-type settlement of the same name. The project is financed by the Investment Fund of Russia, the regional budget, and private investors. The incorporated companies (and the owners of the park) were initially "Nizhnekamskneftekhim" and the "Small Business Development Management Company". The owner of the park subsequently changed and the project was reorganized in 2019. As a result, Kamskie Polyany joined the Moscow company for the production of "Nova Roll-stretch" film. This enterprise became one of the city-forming enterprises and was included in the list of backbone enterprises of the Republic of Tatarstan.

The industrial park for metalworking "Pioneer" opened in the Nizhnekamsky district in 2019. It was built on the site of a former brick factory. The park area is 9.3 hectares with a built-up area is more than 15,000 m2. The main resident of the park and its co-founder is a Chinese plant for painting and applying polymer coatings on rolled steel Kamastal. According to the publication "Business Online", Chinese partners spent 428.7 million rubles on organizing production [56] [57]. Six more residents were attracted to the industrial park with investments of 172 million rubles, and fifty new jobs were created in 2019.

The first stage of construction on the third industrial park "Nizhnekamsk" was completed in 2019. It is located within the city at the intersection of Pervoprokhodtsev and Industrialnaya streets. Enterprise-residents of the industrial park receive land for the establishment of production for free. The park's initial resident, the "Metakam" company invested 48 million rubles to set up its production facility. The application of the company for the production of commercial refrigeration equipment "Smart Machines" was approved in August 2020. Its initial investment amounted to 1.5 billion rubles. The park administration announced the expansion of the territory from 20 to 90 hectares, which will allow it to locate 20 more industries and create about 15,000 new jobs.

The total investment, excluding budgetary funds, amounted to almost 35 billion rubles in January 2020.

=== Transport ===
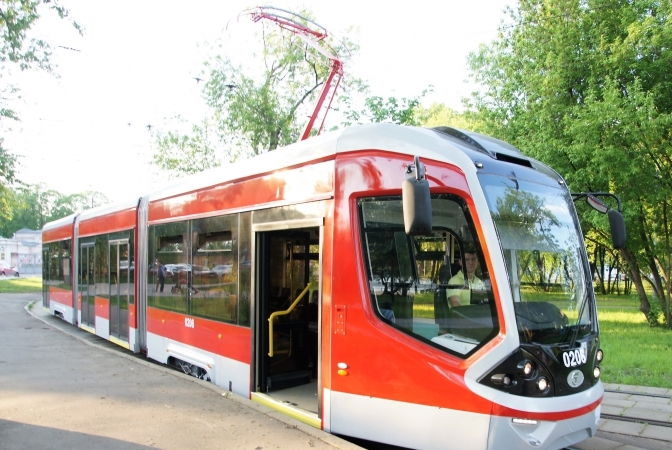
Tram "Varyag" in Nizhnekamsk

The Nizhnekamsky municipal district is located in the central part of the Republic of Tatarstan on the left bank of the Kama River. Nizhnekamsk is connected by rail with Bugulma and Vyatskiye Polyany, which has access to the Gorky Railway and Kuybyshev Railway. There is a passenger pier in the village of Krasny Klyuch.

The distance between Nizhnekamsk and Kazan is 237 km. The main highways are Naberezhnye Chelny - Zainsk - Almetyevsk - Nizhnekamsk, Chistopol - Nizhnekamsk, Nizhnekamsk - Krasny Klyuch, Nizhnekamsk - Prosti, 16K-0862 Zainsk - Sukharevo, 16K-0858 Zainsk - Sheremetyevka, 16K-1251 "Kamskie Polyany - Sheremetyevka", 16K-1255 "Sheremetyevka - Novosheshminsk". International airport "Begishevo" is located 24 km southwest of Nizhnekamsk.

There are 7 trams, 9 city buses, 10 suburban, and 16 special bus routes to the industrial zone in the Nizhnekamsky municipal district. 14 additional seasonal commuter routes are opened in summer. The length of tram routes is 63.5 km, bus routes - 180.2 km, suburban - more than 570 km. Work is underway in the region to develop automated transport and tourist cable cars.

== Ecology ==
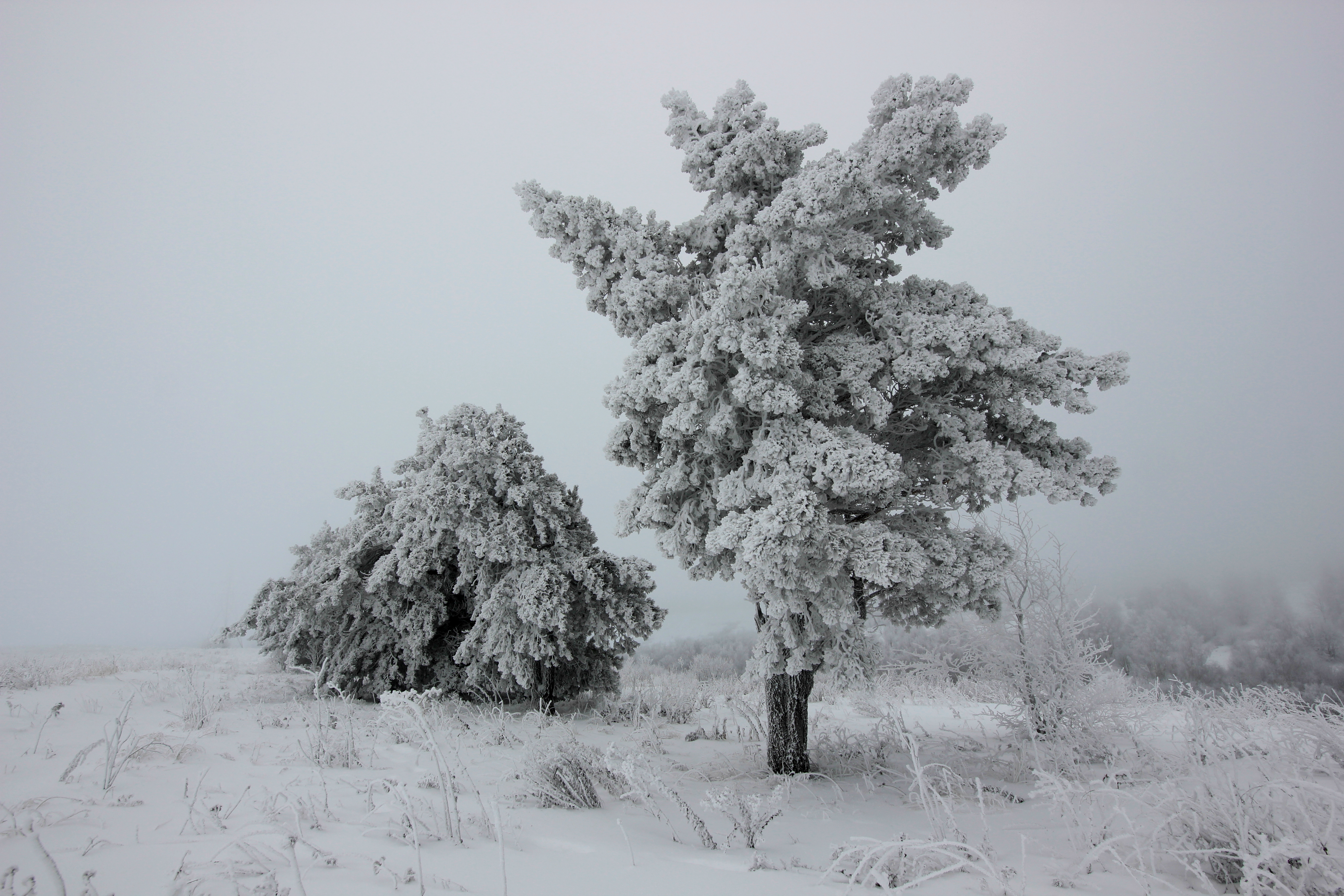
Borkovskaya dacha

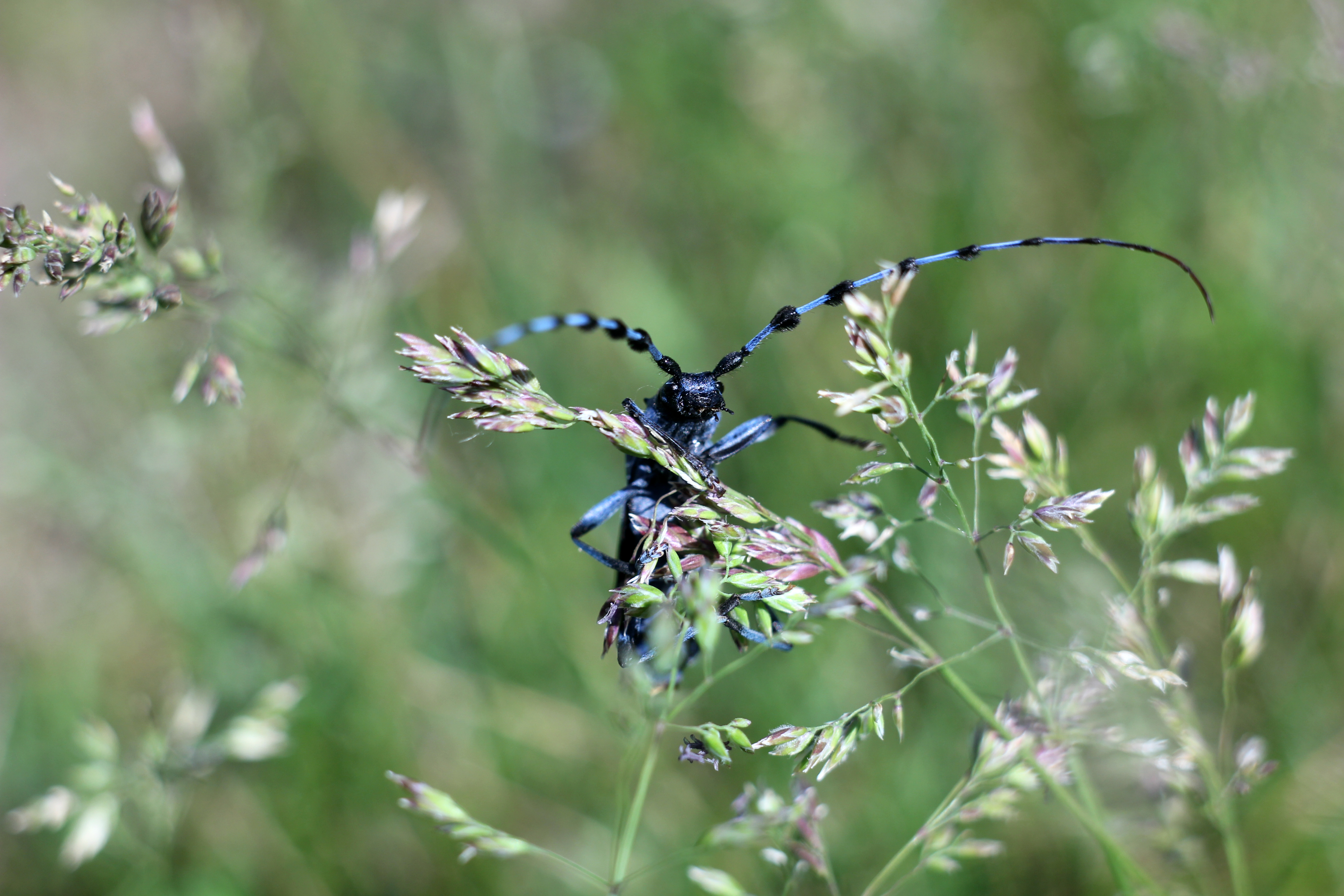
Barbel beetle

According to ecologists, there are more than 6,000 air pollution points in the Nizhnekamsky district, which are mainly associated with the processing of petroleum products. A regional law abolished the village of Alan in 2016, which suffered from phenol pollution. All residents were resettled.

Based on scientific studies, the district authorities implemented an environmental protection program for Nizhnekamsk allocating 13 billion rubles in 2012-2015. 98% of the funds were collected from regional enterprises with "Nizhnekamskneftekhim" alone implementing more than 420 environmental projects from 2014 to 2020. The plant reduced the consumption of process water, reduced the unit costs of raw materials and heat energy, reduced emissions of pollutants by 18.6% and wastewater discharge by 2.8%. The share of emissions of harmful substances into the atmosphere has decreased by 54% over the past 19 years of the company's operation.

Environmental air monitoring is carried out four times a day by three stationary posts in Nizhnekamsk. The reconstruction of city air treatment facilities was completed in 2019. According to the head of the Ministry of Ecology of Tatarstan, the ecological situation in Nizhnekamsk for 2020 has been stable [71]. 740 million rubles were also allocated for the liquidation of a large Soviet landfill in the village of Prosty. The final step will be the eco-rehabilitation of the territory and the nearby river.

There is a reservoir with an area of 2,700 km and a length of 200 km on the Kama River in Nizhnekamsk. The State Planning Commission determined a constant water level at 62 meters in 1989. The level of the reservoir was raised to 63.3-63.5 m. on the basis of agreements between the leadership of the republics of Tatarstan, Bashkortostan, and Udmurtia in 2003. This has contributed to the development of shipping.

The eco-park "Oasis" has been in the process of construction on the territory of the Kamskie Polyany village since 2017. The project is funded by the state and republican budgets. 40 million rubles have been allocated for work in 2021.

== Social and Cultural Resources ==
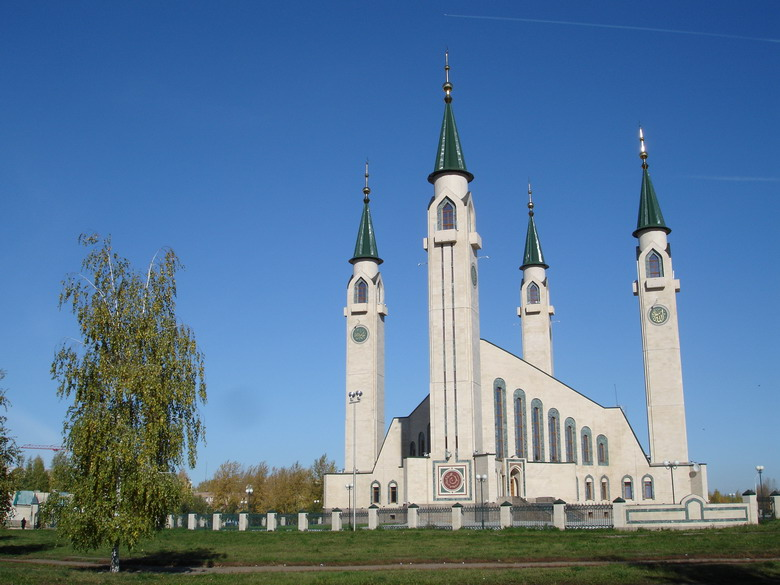
Cathedral Mosque in Nizhnekamsk

There are 31 secondary schools and 24 libraries in the district as well as the Institute of Information Technologies and Telecommunications, Kazan National Research Technical University named after A.N. Tupolev, the Petrochemical College, the Polytechnic College named after E. N. Korolev, the medical, pedagogical, and music schools in the Nizhnekamsky district.

The district has implemented the State Program "Development of Physical Culture and Sports in the Republic of Tatarstan for 2019-2023" since 2019. 33.2 million rubles have been allocated for the program, of which 30.5 are the republic's funds. At the current moment, the number of athletes has grown to slightly more than 7000. The program is planned to increase sports engagement by 54.5%.

The Church of the Intercession of the Theotokos is located in the Nizhnekamsk region. It was erected in the 17th century. The church was destroyed in the 1930s during the time of religious persecution and rebuilt 50 years later at the expense of local residents and patrons.

The central mosque of the region is the Nizhnekamsk Cathedral Mosque built in 1996. It serves as a prayer hall and cultural center. The public complex "Center for the culture and history of the Volga Bulgars and Islam" was organized at the mosque. A museum complex operates in the city. A museum of journalism was opened in the building of the media holding of the Nizhnekamsk TV and Radio Company in 2020. Local newspapers "Tugan yak" ("Native land") and "Nizhnekamskaya Pravda" (published from May 1, 1965, until 2008 were called "Leninskaya Pravda") are published in the Tatar and Russian languages.
