= Polyanki, Vologda Oblast =

Polyanki Полянки
- Village
- Location within Vologda Oblast Location within Russia
- Coordinates: 59°22′N 39°24′E
- Country: Russia
- Region: Vologda Oblast
- District: Vologodsky District
- Time zone: UTC+3:00

Polyanki (Russian: Полянки) is a rural locality (a village) in Kubenskoye Rural Settlement, Vologodsky District, Vologda Oblast, Russia. The population was 7 as of 2002.

== Geography ==
Polyanki is located 46 km northwest of Vologda (the district's administrative centre) by road. Minino is the nearest rural locality.
