= Polyanki, Ilyinsky District, Ivanovo Oblast =

Polyanki Полянки
- Village
- Location within Ivanovo Oblast Location within Russia
- Coordinates: 56°58′N 39°48′E
- Country: Russia
- Region: Ivanovo Oblast
- District: Ilyinsky District
- Time zone: UTC+3:00

Polyanki (Russian: Полянки) is a rural locality (a village) in Ilyinsky District, Ivanovo Oblast, Russia. Population: 17 (2010 census);

== Geography ==
This rural locality is located 2 kilometres (1.2 mi) from Ilyinskoye-Khovanskoye (the district's administrative centre), 71 kilometres (44 mi) from Ivanovo (capital of Ivanovo Oblast) and 189 kilometres (117 mi) from Moscow. Nikitinskoye is the nearest rural locality.
