= Kamskiye Polyany =

Kamskiye Polyany Камские Поляны
- Urban-type settlement

Other transcription(s)
  - Tatar: Кама Аланы
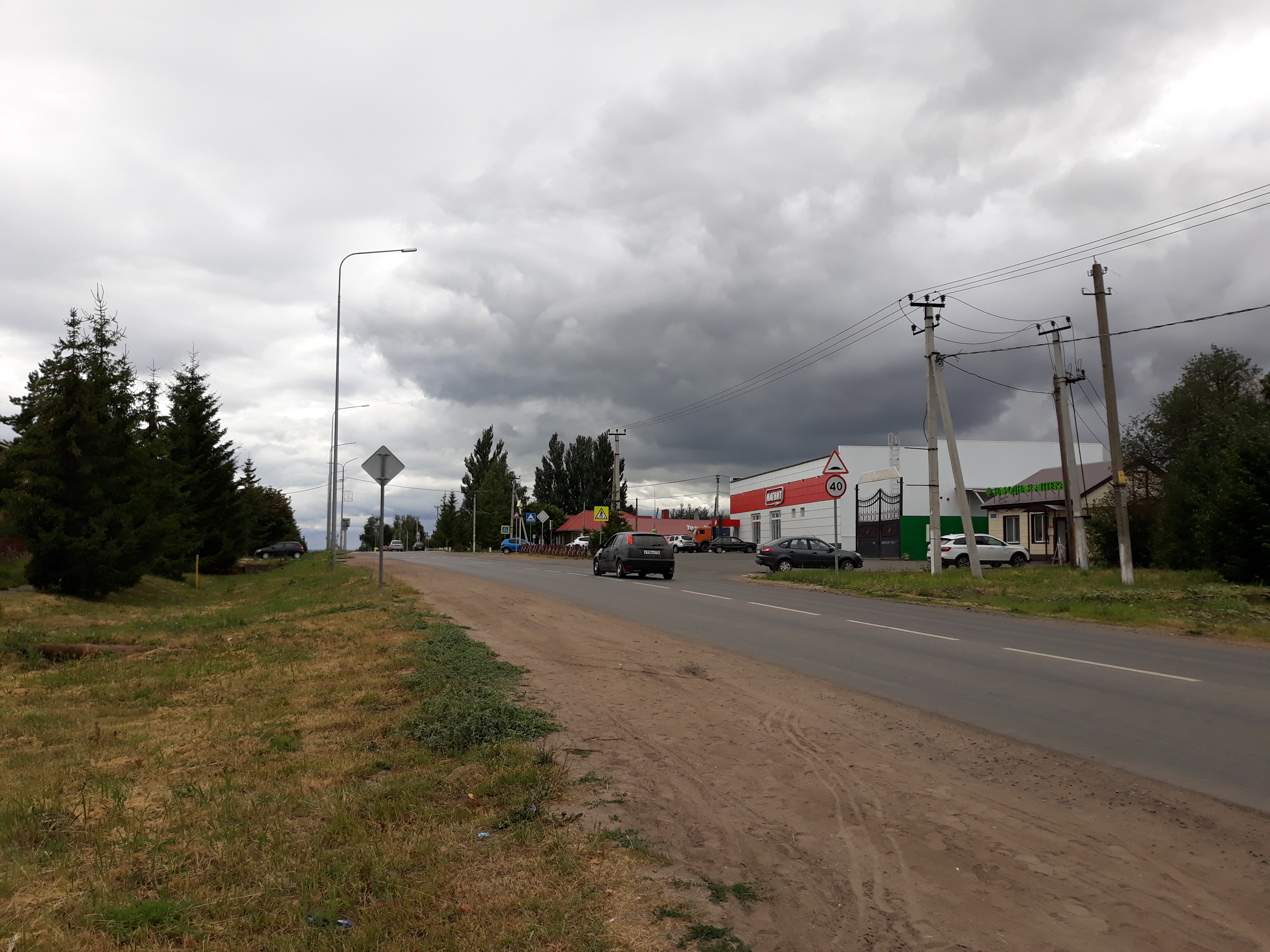

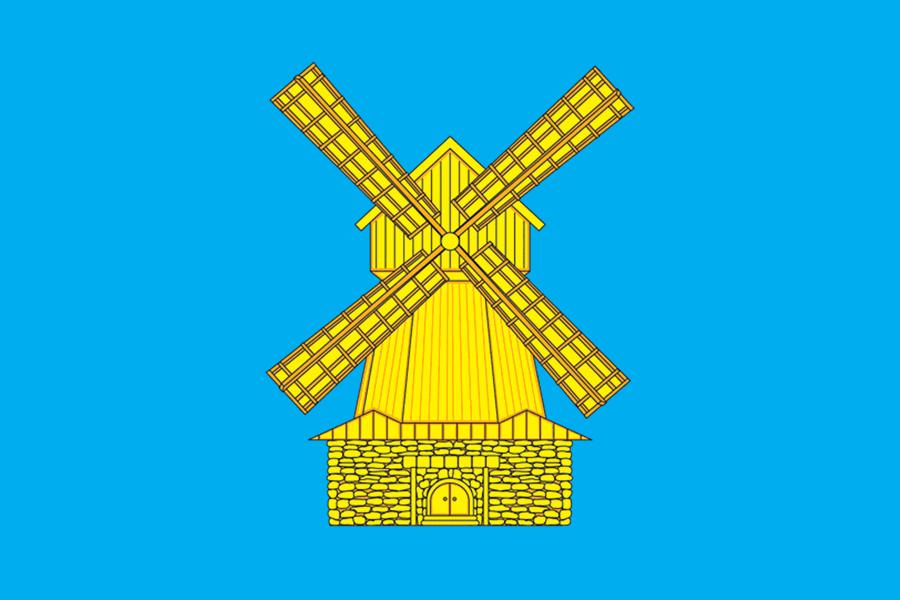
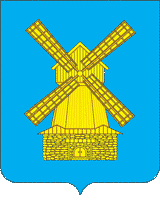
- Flag Coat of arms
- Interactive map of Kamskiye Polyany
- Location of Kamskiye Polyany Kamskiye Polyany (Tatarstan)
- Coordinates: 55°26′N 51°26′E
- Country: Russia
- Federal subject: Tatarstan
- Administrative district: Nizhnekamsky District
- Founded: 18th century
- Urban-type settlement status since: 1982

Population (2010 Census)
  - Total: 15,795
  - Estimate (2021): 13,910 (−11.9%)

Municipal status
  - Municipal district: Nizhnekamsky Municipal District
  - Urban settlement: Kamskiye Polyany Urban Settlement
  - Capital of: Kamskiye Polyany Urban Settlement
- Time zone: UTC+3 (MSK)
- Postal code: 423564
- OKTMO ID: 92644156051
- Website: kampol.e-nk.ru

Kamskiye Polyany (Russian: Ка́мские Поля́ны; Tatar: Кама Аланы) is an urban locality (an urban-type settlement) in Nizhnekamsky District of the Republic of Tatarstan, Russia, located on the left bank of the Kama River, 37 kilometers (23 mi) southwest of Nizhnekamsk, the administrative center of the district. As of the 2010 Census, its population was 15,795.

== History ==
It was established in the 18th century as the selo of Polyanki (Полянки). Due to the construction of the now abandoned Tatar Nuclear Power Station, it was granted urban-type settlement status in 1982.

== Administrative and municipal status ==
Within the framework of administrative divisions, the urban-type settlement of Kamskiye Polyany is subordinated to Nizhnekamsky District. As a municipal division, Kamskiye Polyany is incorporated within Nizhnekamsky Municipal District as Kamskiye Polyany Urban Settlement.

== Economy ==
As of 1997, there were several machine building plants in Kamskiye Polyany, as well as a garment factory, a knitting factory, and a construction panel factory.

== Demographics ==
Kamskiye Polyany population
- 2010 Census: 15,795
- 2002 Census: 15,049
- 1989 Census: 12,167

As of 1989, the population was mostly Russian (52.3%), Tatar (37.9%), Chuvash (3.7%), Ukrainian (1.7%), and Bashkir (1.1%).
