= Naberezhnye Chelny =

City in the Republic of Tatarstan, Russia

Naberezhnye Chelny Набережные Челны
- City

Other transcription(s)
  - Tatar: Яр Чаллы
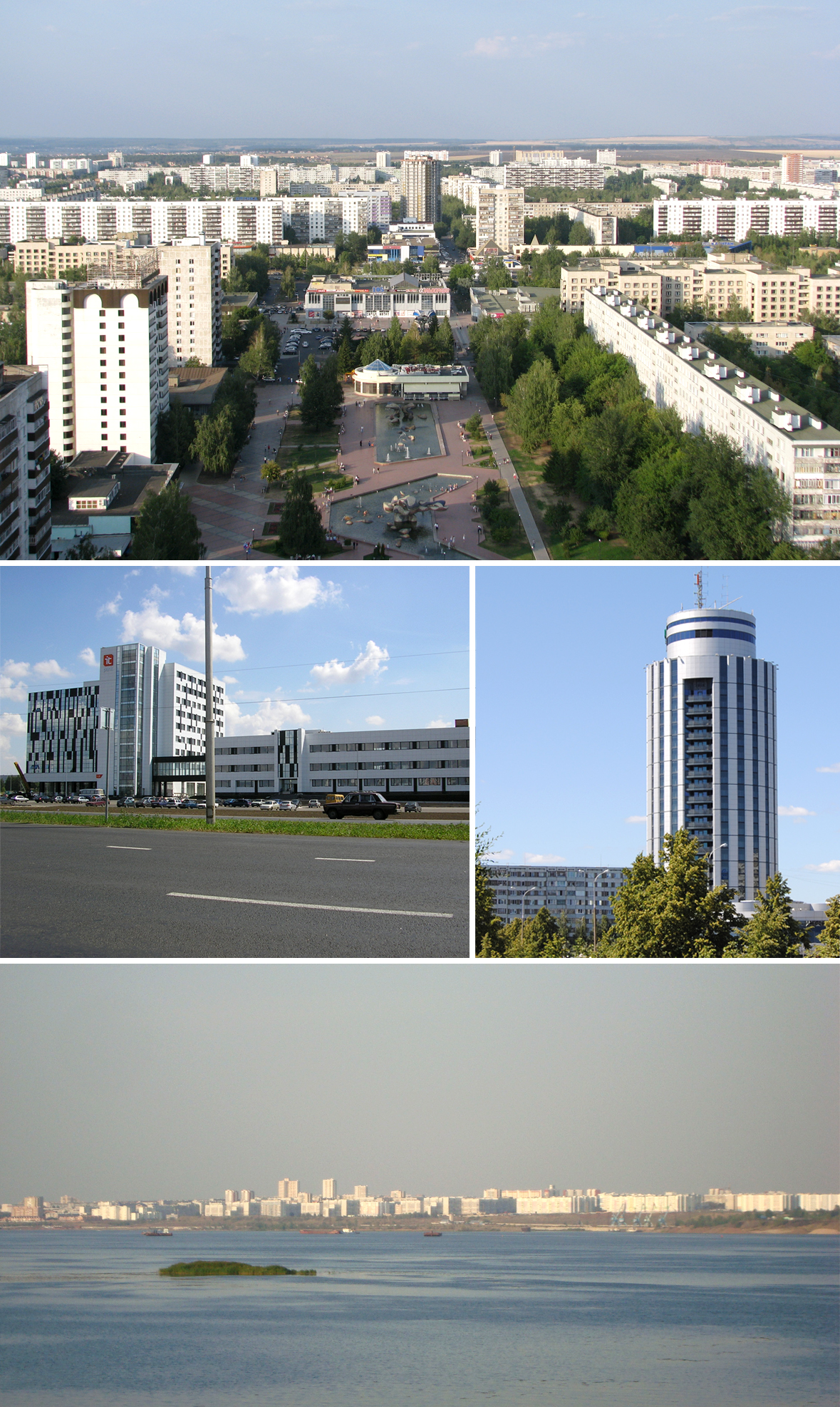
- Clockwise from top: Boulevard of Enthusiasts, «2/18» Business Centre, City view from Kama River, IT park

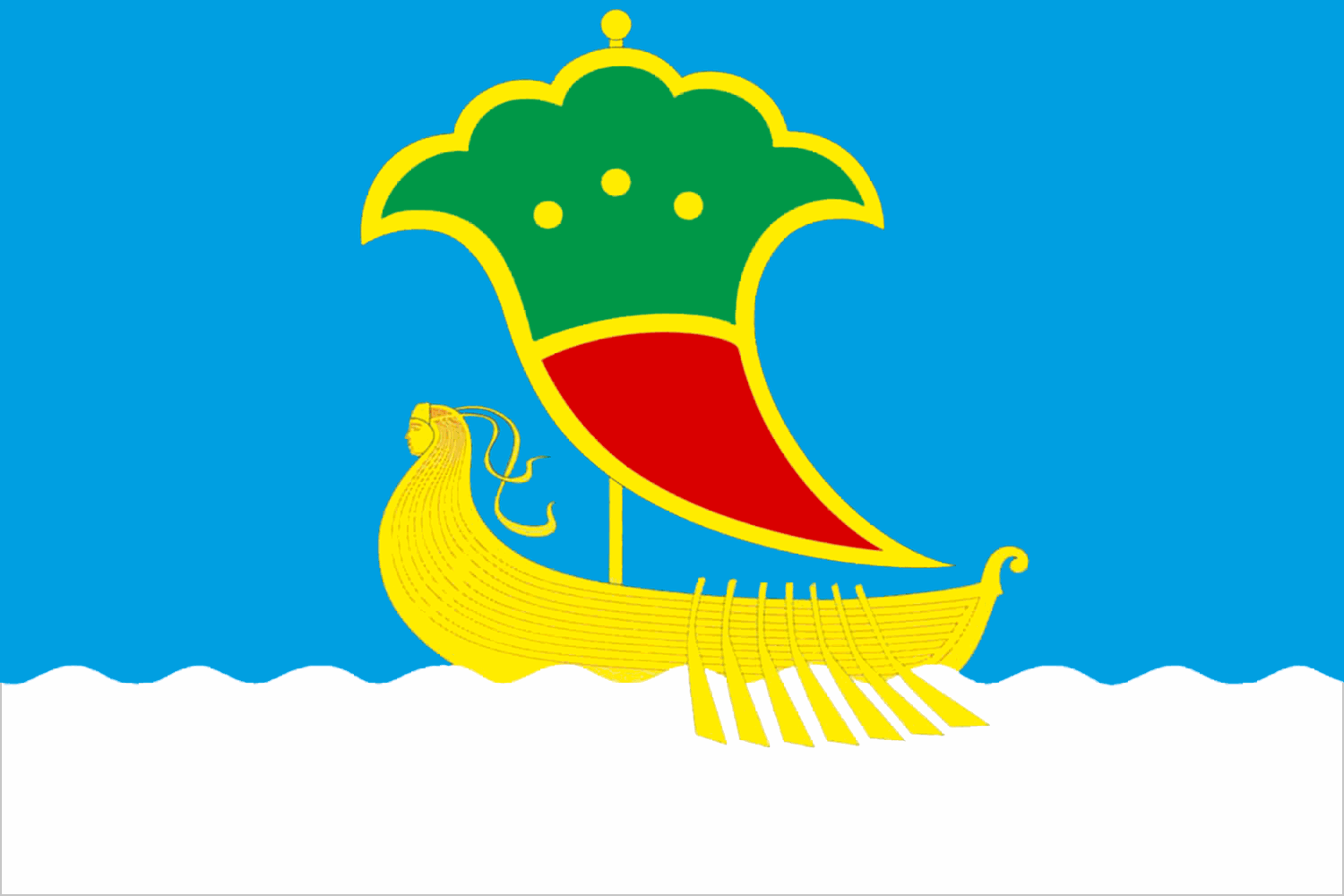
- Flag Coat of arms
- Interactive map of Naberezhnye Chelny
- Location of Naberezhnye Chelny Naberezhnye Chelny (Tatarstan)
- Coordinates: 55°41′N 52°19′E
- Country: Russia
- Federal subject: Tatarstan
- Founded: c. 1172
- City status since: April 10, 1930

Government
  - Body: City Council
  - Mayor: Nail Magdeev
- Elevation: 100 m (330 ft)

Population (2010 Census)
  - Total: 513,193
  - Estimate (2025): 548,221 (+6.8%)
  - Rank: 35th in 2010

Administrative status
  - Subordinated to: city of republic significance of Naberezhnye Chelny
  - Capital of: Tukayevsky District, city of republic significance of Naberezhnye Chelny

Municipal status
  - Urban okrug: Naberezhnye Chelny Urban Okrug
  - Capital of: Naberezhnye Chelny Urban Okrug, Tukayevsky Municipal District
- Time zone: UTC+3 (MSK)
- Postal code: 423800-423849
- Dialing code: +7 8552
- OKTMO ID: 92730000001
- City Day: August 10
- Website: www.nabchelny.ru

Naberezhnye Chelny (Russian: На́бережные Челны́, IPA: [ˈnabʲɪrʲɪʐnɨjə tɕɪlˈnɨ]; Tatar: Яр Чаллы, IPA: [ˈjar ɕɑlːɤ̆]) is the second largest city in the Republic of Tatarstan, Russia. A major industrial center, Naberezhnye Chelny stands on the Kama River 225 kilometers (140 mi) east of Kazan near Nizhnekamsk Reservoir. Population: 548,434 (2021 census); 513,193 (2010 census); 509,870 (2002 census); 500,309 (1989 Soviet census).

Historical population
Year	Pop.	±%
1897	1,000	—
1926	4,000	+300.0%
1939	9,400	+135.0%
1959	19,103	+103.2%
1970	37,923	+98.5%
1979	301,381	+694.7%
1989	500,309	+66.0%
2002	509,870	+1.9%
2010	513,193	+0.7%
2021	548,434	+6.9%
Source: Census data

The city was briefly known as Brezhnev from 1982 to 1988.

== History ==
Naberezhnye Chelny was granted town status on August 10, 1930, and was called Brezhnev (after Leonid Brezhnev) from 1982 to 1988.

The city of Naberezhnye Chelny was one of the residence centers of the Udmurt Jews, who spoke Udmurtish Yiddish.

== Administrative and municipal status ==
The Administrative divisions of Naberezhnye Chelny consists of three districts;

- Avtozavodsky
- Komsomolsky
- Tsentraly

Within the framework of administrative divisions, Naberezhnye Chelny serves as the administrative center of Tukayevsky District, even though it is not a part of it. As an administrative division, it is incorporated separately as the city of republic significance of Naberezhnye Chelny—an administrative unit with the status equal to that of the districts. As a municipal division, the city of republic significance of Naberezhnye Chelny is incorporated as Naberezhnye Chelny Urban Okrug.

== Economy ==
Kamaz and ZMA trucks are produced there, and the city is one of the largest planned centers in the world related to vehicle production. With more than five square kilometres (2 sq mi) dedicated to production, the Kamaz plant is the largest vehicle factory in the world.

== Transportation ==
=== Long-distance transport ===
Naberezhnye Chelny is a major railway, motor transport, and aviation hub, known on the Kama river port.

The city has a structural unit of the Kuibyshev Railway JSC "Russian Railways" - Kama KBS railway department, which carries out operational management of transport in the Kama region (railroad Agryz Akbash). Immediately Naberezhnye Chelny city is served by two railway stations.

The first, Red Field with 28 station tracks for incoming and outgoing trains, a freight yard for loading and unloading cars, and a sorting slide for the formation and separation of trains.

The second, its cargo-passenger station Naberezhnye Chelny accommodates loading and unloading of wagons supplied by access roads to distribution centers and processing plants. A modern combined train and bus station was built allowing simultaneous reception of 1,500 passengers. The station Naberezhnye Chelny long-distance trains follow a direct line to Moscow, Kazan, Ulyanovsk, Izhevsk, Bugul'ma, and in the summer to Adler. Local train service provided flights rail buses to Mendeleyevsk and Bugul'my.

In addition, the city has departmental railway sector, belonging to OJSC "KAMAZ" and JSC "Kamgesenergostroy" that can handle up to 1,200 cars per day.

River port Naberezhnye Chelny allows you to receive treatment under dry cargo and passenger ships mixed "river-sea". It has a dock for the processing, storage of packaged cargoes and containers. Its length is 217 linear meters, with design possibilities for cargo up to 112 tons in the navigation. The port has a river and a passenger station, which can simultaneously dock four vessels. Infrastructure station can serve up to 200,000 passengers for navigation.

International Airport Begishevo serves the cities Nizhnekamsk agglomeration and Nizhnekamsk WPK.

=== Public transportation ===
Public transport represents 13 tram routes, more than 30 bus routes and taxi, the taxi (including the so-called Social taxi carrying several passengers fares in taxis).

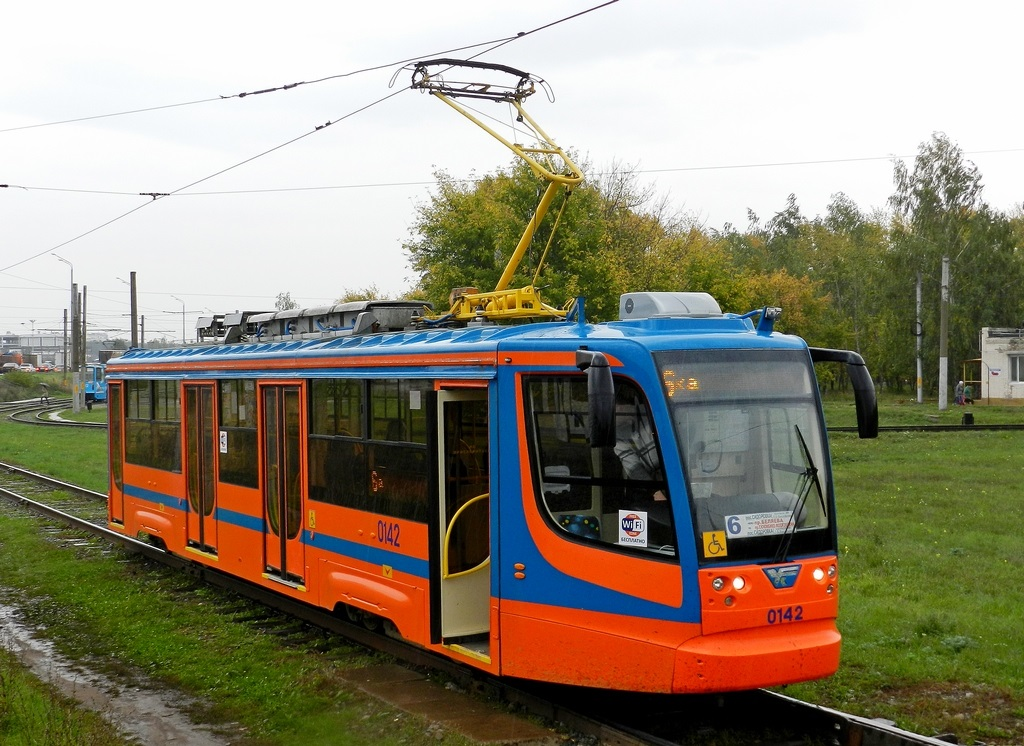
A Tram in Naberezhnye Chelny

The Naberezhnochelninsky tram is one of the latest new tram systems in the USSR and Russia. It was created to provide a large passenger flow between the residential areas of the city and a vast industrial complex KAMAZ and other large enterprises. Unlike most in post-Soviet Russia, the city's tram system expanded in the 1990s and 2000s, and has plans for further development, including both new construction sites in the city, and creating an inter-city light rail line to the Yelabuga, a project which was developed in the Soviet period.

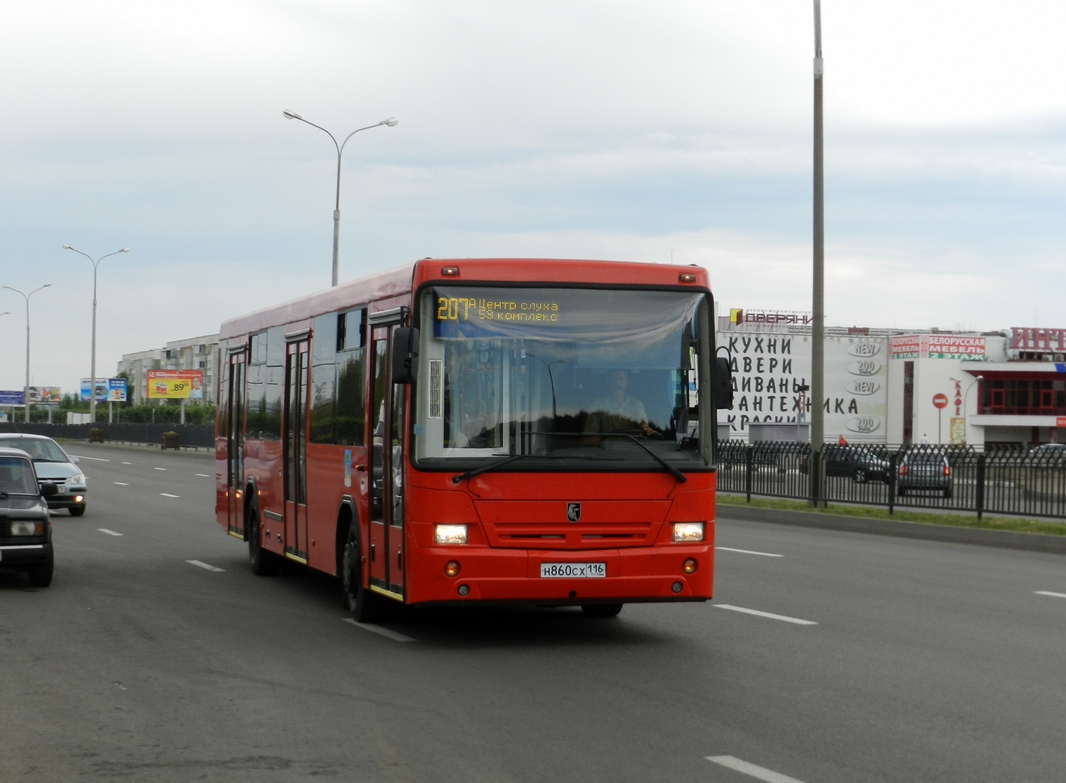
NefAZ-5299 bus

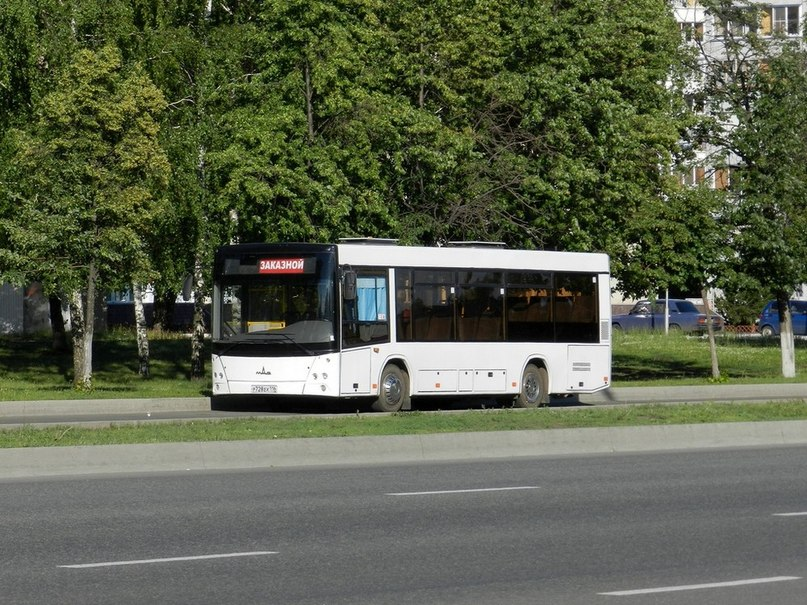
MAZ-206 bus

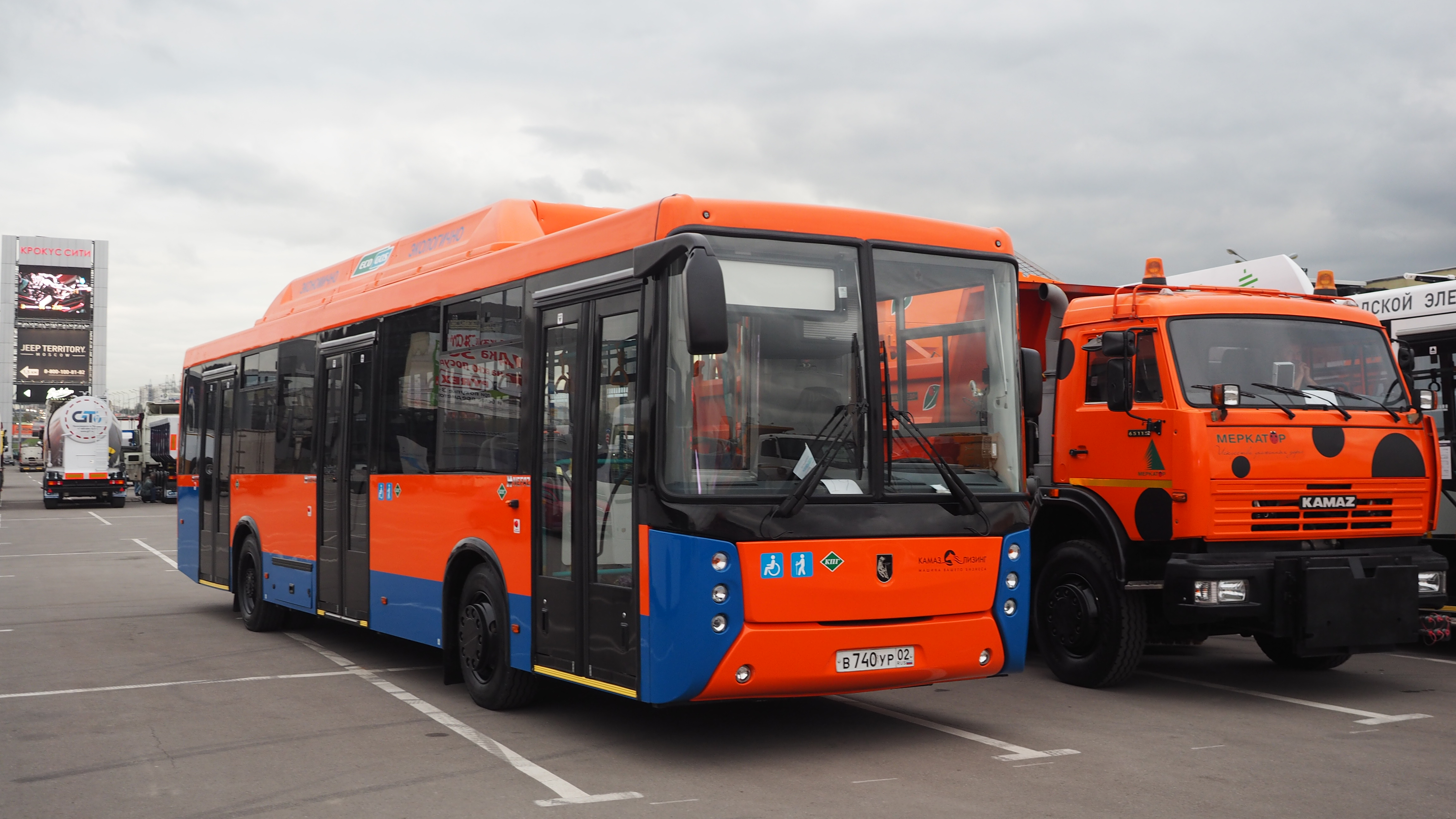
NefAZ-5299 CNG bus, more than 100 such buses are worked in city since 2015

== Culture ==
Alkonost, a Russian doom-folk metal band, was formed in Naberezhnye Chelny in 1995.

== Sports ==
FC KAMAZ Naberezhnye Chelny is an association football club based in Naberezhnye Chelny, playing in the Russian Second Division.

== Gallery ==
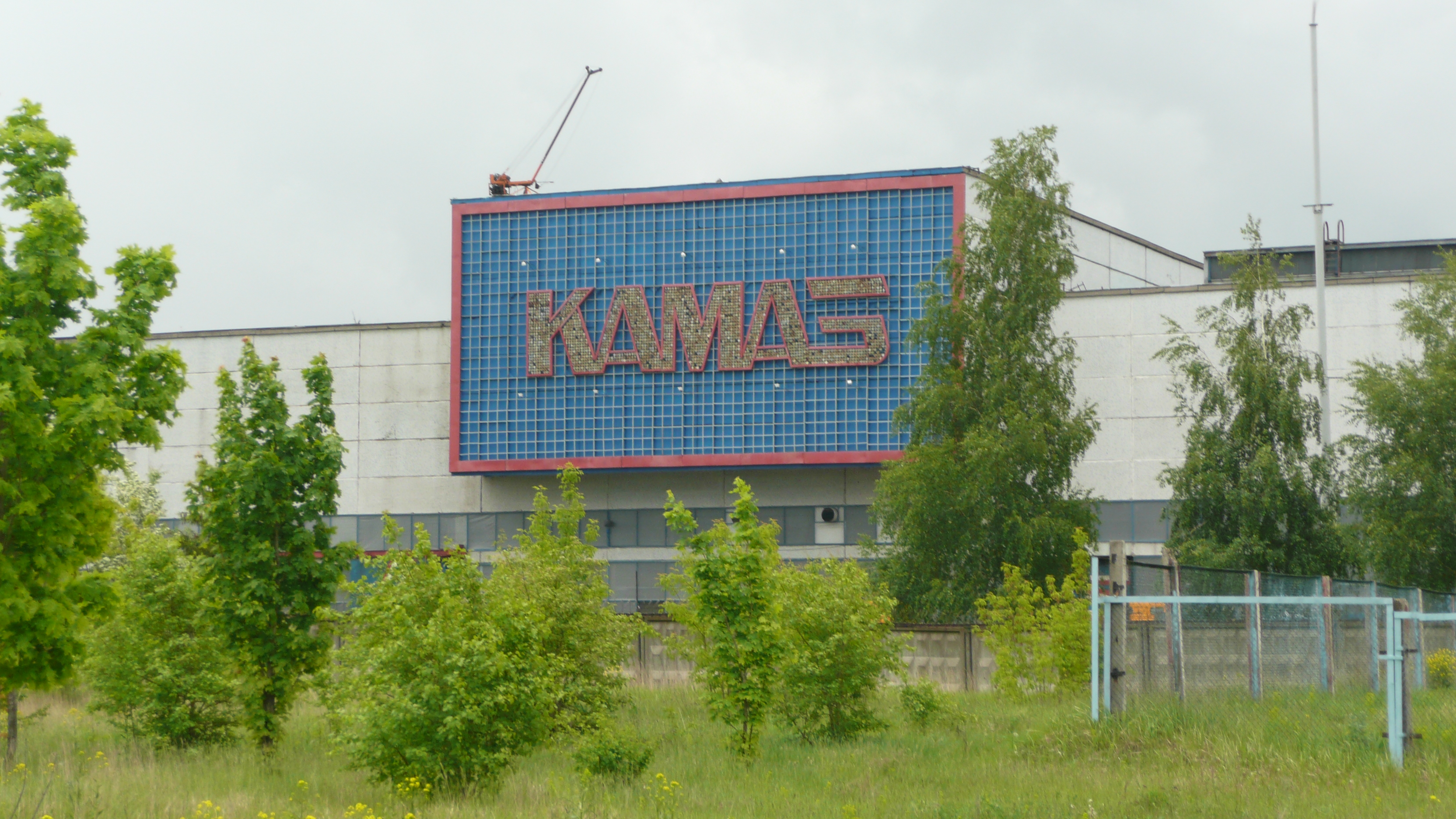
The production building of Kamaz

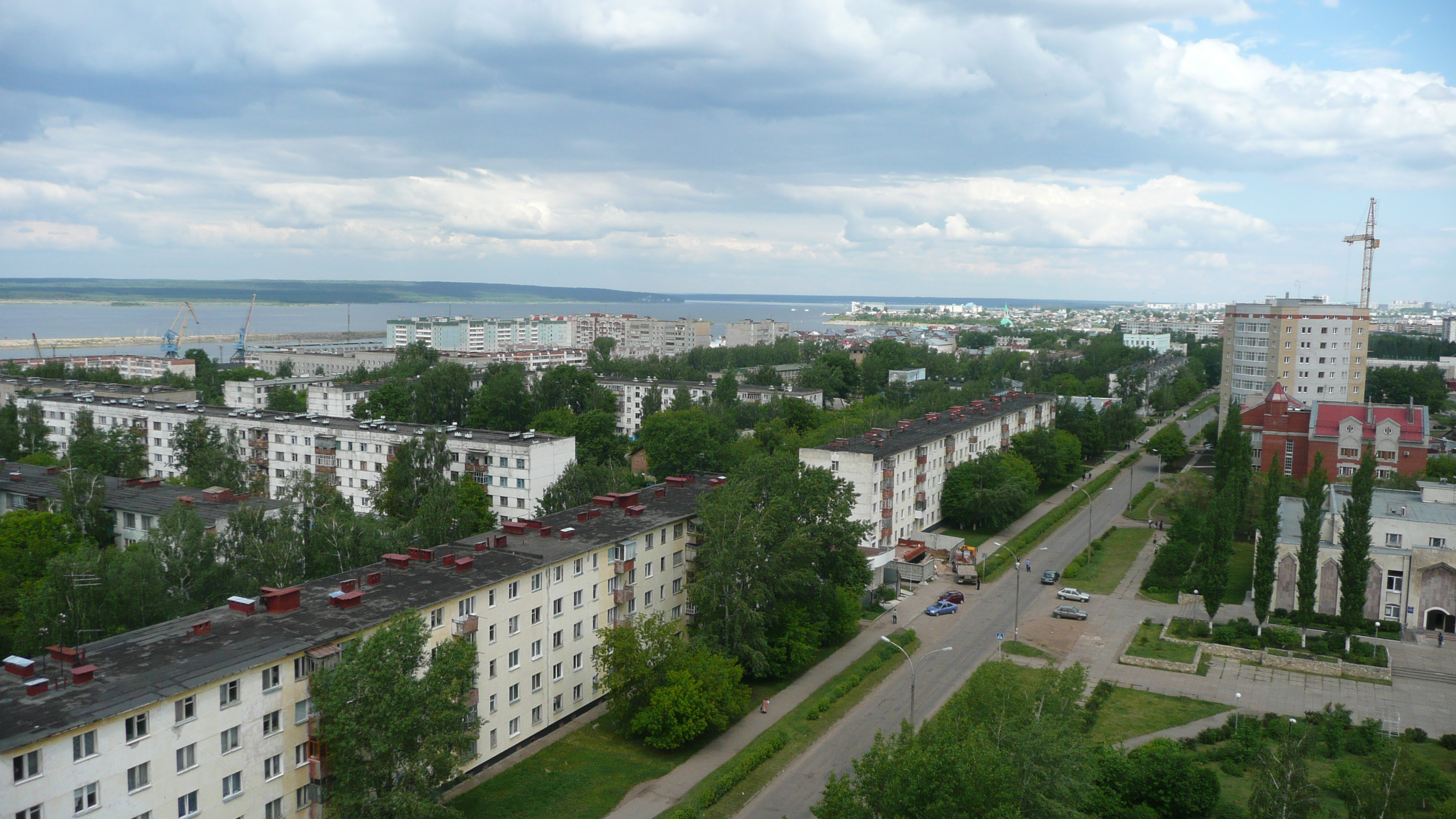
View from the hotel Tatarstan

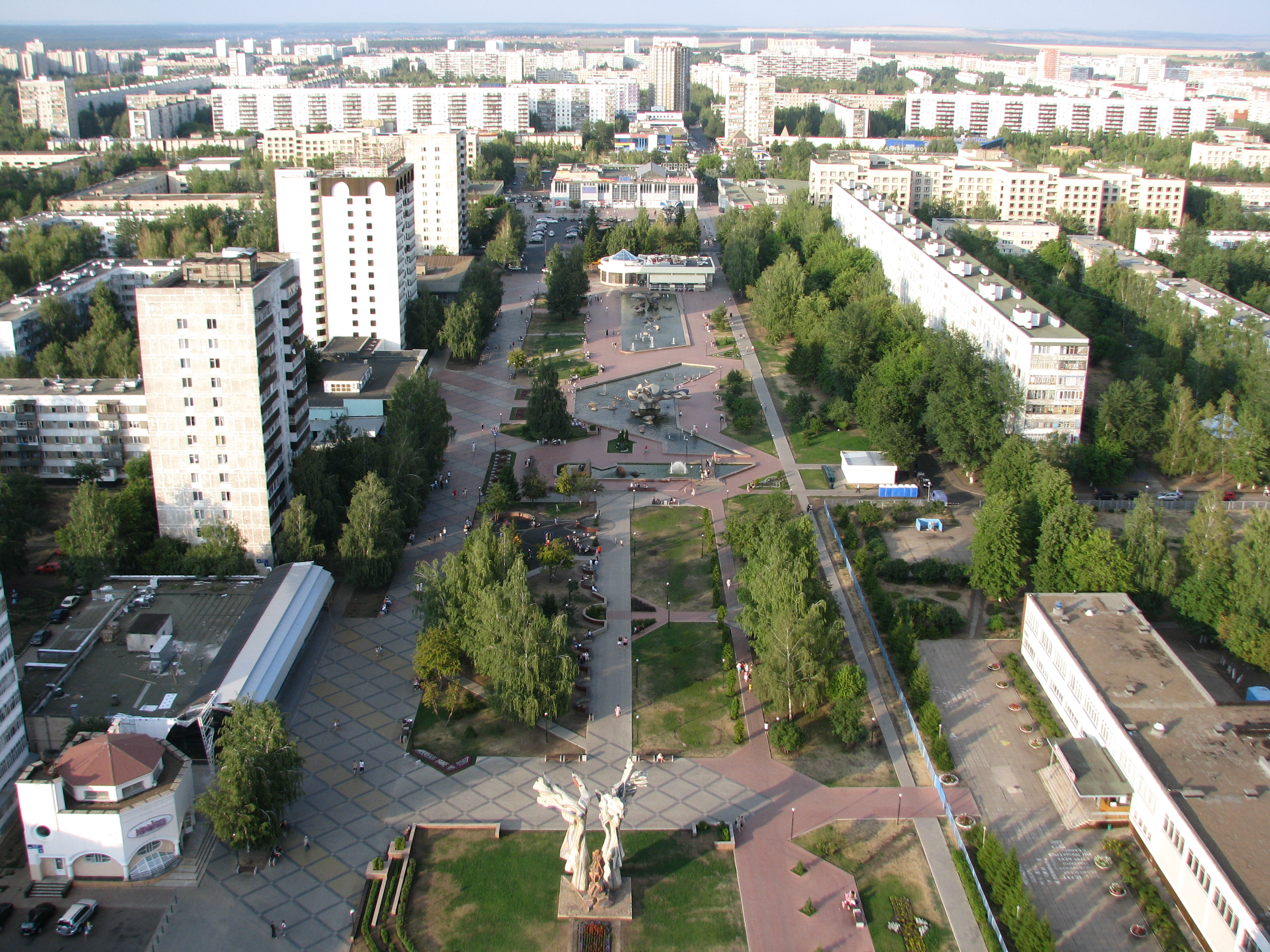
View of Naberezhnye Chelny

== Sister cities ==
- Liaocheng, China (since 2009)
