= Kalevala (band) =

Russian folk metal band

Калевала
- Origin: Moscow, Russia
- Genres: Folk metal; power metal
- Years active: 2007–present
- Label: Sound Age Productions
- Members: Ксения Маркевич / Xenia Markevich; Никита Андриянов / Nikita Andrianov; Денис Золотов / Denis Zolotov; Алексей Митрофанов / Alex Mitrofanov
- Website: kalevala-folk.ru

Kalevala (Russian: Калевала) is a Russian folk metal band.

== Name ==
The name of the band is derived from the Finnish national epic. The group chose this name because of lead vocalist Xenia Markevich's Finnish parents. Moreover, the band is inspired by ancient Finnish and Sami music, Finno-Ugric legends, and contemporary Finnish bands like Finntroll, Korpiklaani, etc.

== History ==
After a concert in Penza on 15 April 2007 with Nevid, singer Xenia and guitarist Nikita Andrianov decided to leave the band and start a new one. Together with keyboardist and accordion player Alexandr Oleinikov, bassist Alexandr Schmel, and drummer Mark Vasili, they started Kalevala.

In April 2008, the band released their debut album, Kudel Belosnezhnogo L'na. One year later, they came out with their second record, Kukushkiny Djeti, followed by Vjed'ma a year after.

In 2016, Kalevala held their first concert tour outside of the former Soviet Union, named Hail the Spring!, visiting Eastern Europe, France, and Germany.

== Band members ==
Current

- Xenia Markevich – vocals
- Nikita Andrianov – guitar
- Alex Mitrofanov – bass
- Denis Zolotov – drums
- Aleksandr "olen" Oleynikov – accordion, keyboards

Past

- Mark Vasili – drums
- Aleksandr "bumblebee" Smel – bass, mouth harp
- Kirill "Kesha" Perov – drums

== Discography ==
Studio albums

- Kudel Belosnezhnogo L'na / Кудель белоснежного льна (2008)
- Kukushkiny Deti / Кукушкины дети (2009)
- Ved'ma / Ведьма (2010)
- Luna I Grosh / Луна и Грош (2013)
- Metel / Метель (2017)

EPs

- Таусень-Рада (2009)
- Доху я купила (2014)

Live albums

- Osen v stile folk / Осень в Стиле фолк (2012)

Singles

- "Demo '07" (2007)
- "Tausen-rada / Таусень-рада" (2009)
- "Kolocolchick / Колокольчик" (2009)
- "Сон-река" (2011)
- "Волчий зов" (2014)
- "Благодар тебе, Велесе" (2020)
