= List of Tau Kappa Epsilon members =

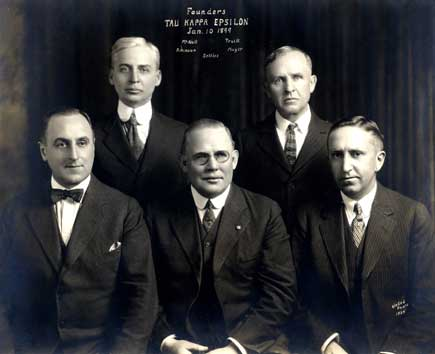
The five founders of Tau Kappa Epsilon. Clockwise from top left: James Carson McNutt, Owen Ison Truitt, Clarence Arthur Mayer, Joseph Lorenzo Settles, Charles Roy Atkinson

Tau Kappa Epsilon members (commonly referred to as Tekes) are individuals who have been initiated into Tau Kappa Epsilon (ΤΚΕ) Fraternity. The fraternity was founded by five men – Joseph Lorenzo Settles, James Carson McNutt, Clarence Arthur Mayer, Owen Ison Truitt, and Charles Roy Atkinson on January 10, 1899, at Illinois Wesleyan University in Bloomington, Illinois. Members traditionally are initiated into a chapter during their collegiate career, although honorary members may not necessarily have attended a university or college. As of 2022, the fraternity has more than 295,000 initiated members, 221 active chapters and colonies, and almost 12,000 collegiate members.

The list of Tau Kappa Epsilon brothers spans over multiple careers including politics, business, athletics, and entertainment. Among the most recognized include U.S. President Ronald Reagan who was the recipient of the Order of the Golden Eagle, the fraternity's highest honor. Other widely recognized political figures include former West Virginia Senator Robert Byrd, who at the time of his death was the longest-serving member in the history of the United States Congress, and former Arkansas Governor and Republican presidential candidate Mike Huckabee, who while running for president launched a ΤΚΕ-specific website and visited Tekes on the campaign trail.

Dozens of top chief executive officers (CEOs) and university presidents have also made the list such as Starbucks CEO Howard Schultz, Salesforce CEO Marc Benioff, and Steve Forbes of Forbes magazine, who was the fraternity's 250,000th initiate. Numerous athletic and music superstars are also Tekes including NFL quarterbacks Terry Bradshaw, Phil Simms, Blake Bortles and Aaron Rodgers, Olympians Douglas Blubaugh, Sim Iness, and Johnny Quinn, and singers Elvis Presley, Willie Nelson, and the Everly Brothers.

== Business ==
Name	Original chapter	Notability	Ref.
Marc Benioff	Beta-Sigma / University of Southern California	Founder, Chairman, and CEO of Salesforce (1999–present), co-chair and owner of Time (2018–present)	
Robert L. Brock	Alpha-Phi / University of Kansas	Business executive and co-founder of ShowBiz Pizza Place and the Residence Inn line of hotels	
Edward C. Droste	Epsilon / Iowa State University	Co-founder of Hooters	
James P. Evans	Gamma-Omega / Eastern Illinois University	President and CEO of Best Western (1998–2002), CEO of Jenny Craig, Inc. (2003–2005)	
Aaron Fechter	Lambda-Alpha / University of South Florida	Invented the Whac-A-Mole and created The Rock-afire Explosion animatronic show at ShowBiz Pizza Place, which merged into Chuck E. Cheese	
Alan Gershenhorn	Epsilon-Omicron / University of Houston	Executive Vice President and CCO of UPS (2014–2018)	
James Goodnight	Beta-Beta / North Carolina State University	CEO of the SAS Institute (1976–present)	
Bruce S. Gordon	Psi / Gettysburg College	Corporate Director of CBS, Northrop Grumman, and Tyco International, President of the NAACP (2005–2007)	
Earle Harbison Jr.	Xi / Washington University in St. Louis	President and chief operating officer of Monsanto (1986–1993)	
Conrad Hilton	Alpha-Omicron / New Mexico State University	Founder of Hilton Hotels & Resorts and Hilton Worldwide	
George E. Keck	Gamma / University of Illinois	President of United Airlines (1966–1970) and founder of the UAL Corporation	
James M. Kilts	Delta / Knox College	Chairman and CEO of The Gillette Company (2001–2005)	
Hilton Koch	Mu-Zeta / Nicholls State University	Owner of Hilton Furniture, former owner of the Houston Comets (2007–2008)	
Gary LaBranche	Omicron / Ohio State University	President and CEO of the Association for Corporate Growth (2008–2017), Grand Prytanis (Grand President) of Tau Kappa Epsilon (1997–1999)	
Harry J. Lloyd	Beta-Theta / University of Missouri	Founder and CEO of House of Lloyd (1952–1996), developed the village of Loch Lloyd, Missouri	
W. Alan McCollough	Delta-Upsilon / Missouri Valley College	CEO of Circuit City (2000–2006)	
Charles W. Moorman	Beta-Pi / Georgia Institute of Technology	CEO of Amtrak (2016–2017) and Norfolk Southern Railway (2005–2015)	
Robert Nardelli	Zeta-Theta / Western Illinois University	Chairman and CEO at Chrysler (2007–2009) and Chairman, President, and CEO at The Home Depot (2000–2007)	
Paul Oreffice	Alpha-Zeta / Purdue University	President and CEO (1975–1992) and Chairman (1986–1992) of Dow Chemical Company	
Howard Schultz	Theta-Iota / Northern Michigan University	CEO of Starbucks (1987–2000, 2008–2017, 2022–2023)	
Harold Shaub	Alpha-Tau Colony (Note: The brother was initiated before a charter was given by ΤΚΕ Headquarters, which establishes a colony as an official chapter.) / Drexel University	President and CEO of Campbell's (1972–1980)	
Andrew C. Taylor	Gamma-Tau / University of Denver	Chairman and CEO (2001–2013) and Executive Chairman (2013–present) of Enterprise Holdings, which operates Enterprise Rent-A-Car, Alamo Rent a Car, and National Car Rental	
Kenny Troutt	Beta-Chi / Southern Illinois University Carbondale	Founder and CEO of Excel Communications (1988–1999), owner of WinStar Farm, two-time winner of the Kentucky Derby and winner of the 13th Triple Crown in 2018 with racehorse Justify	
Charles Rudolph Walgreen Jr.	Upsilon / University of Michigan	Former President (1939–1963) and Chairman (1963–1976) of Walgreens	
Miles D. White	Alpha-Zeta / Purdue University	Chairman and CEO (1999–2020) and Executive Chairman (2020–2021) at Abbott Laboratories	

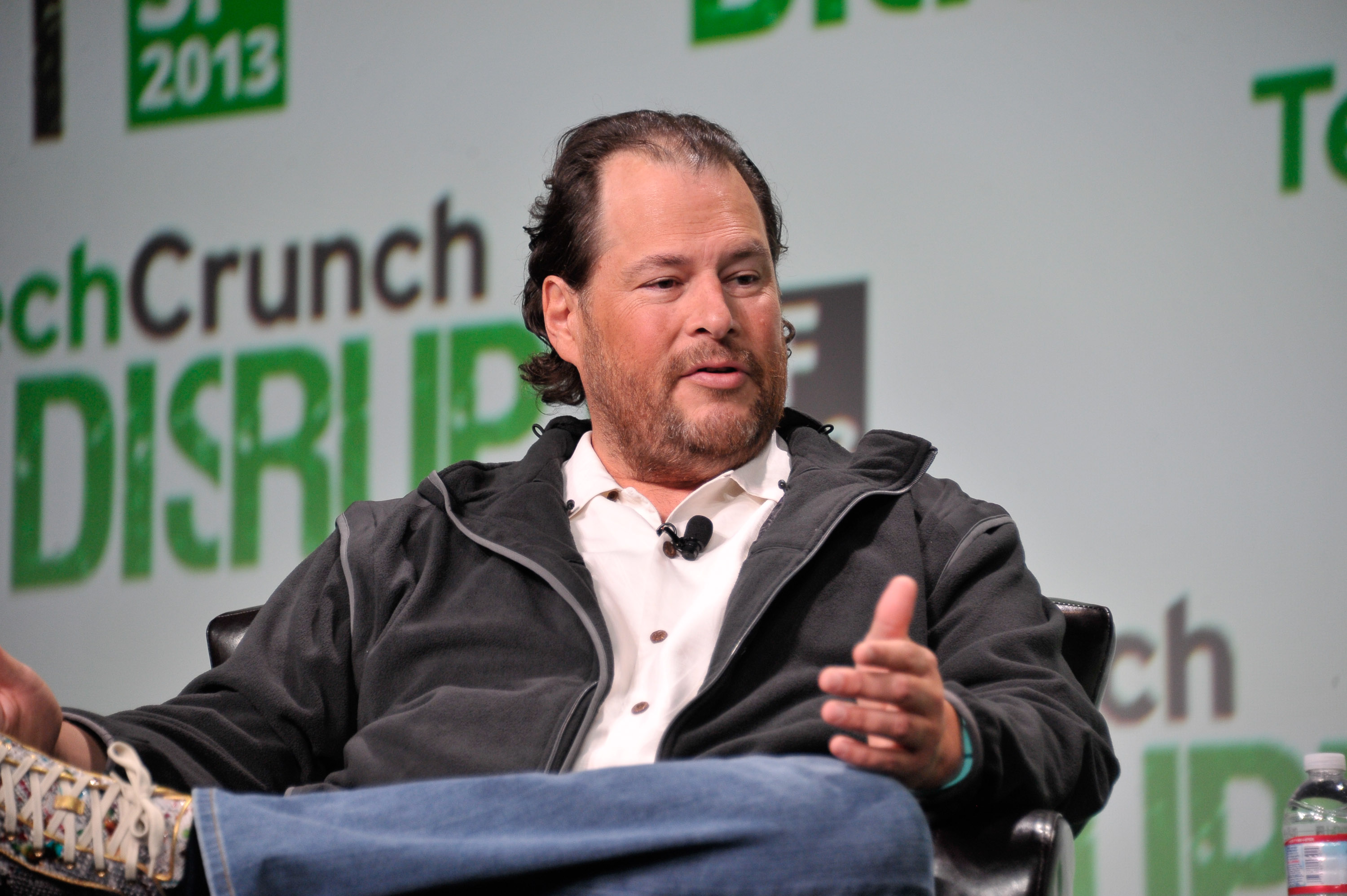
Marc Benioff

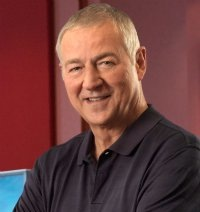
James Goodnight

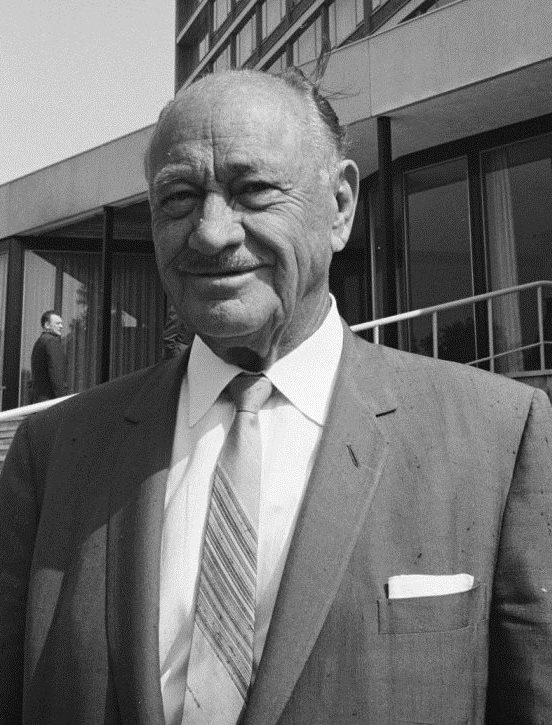
Conrad Hilton

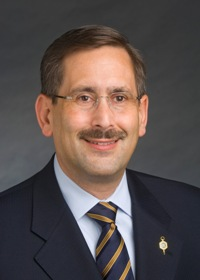
Gary LaBranche

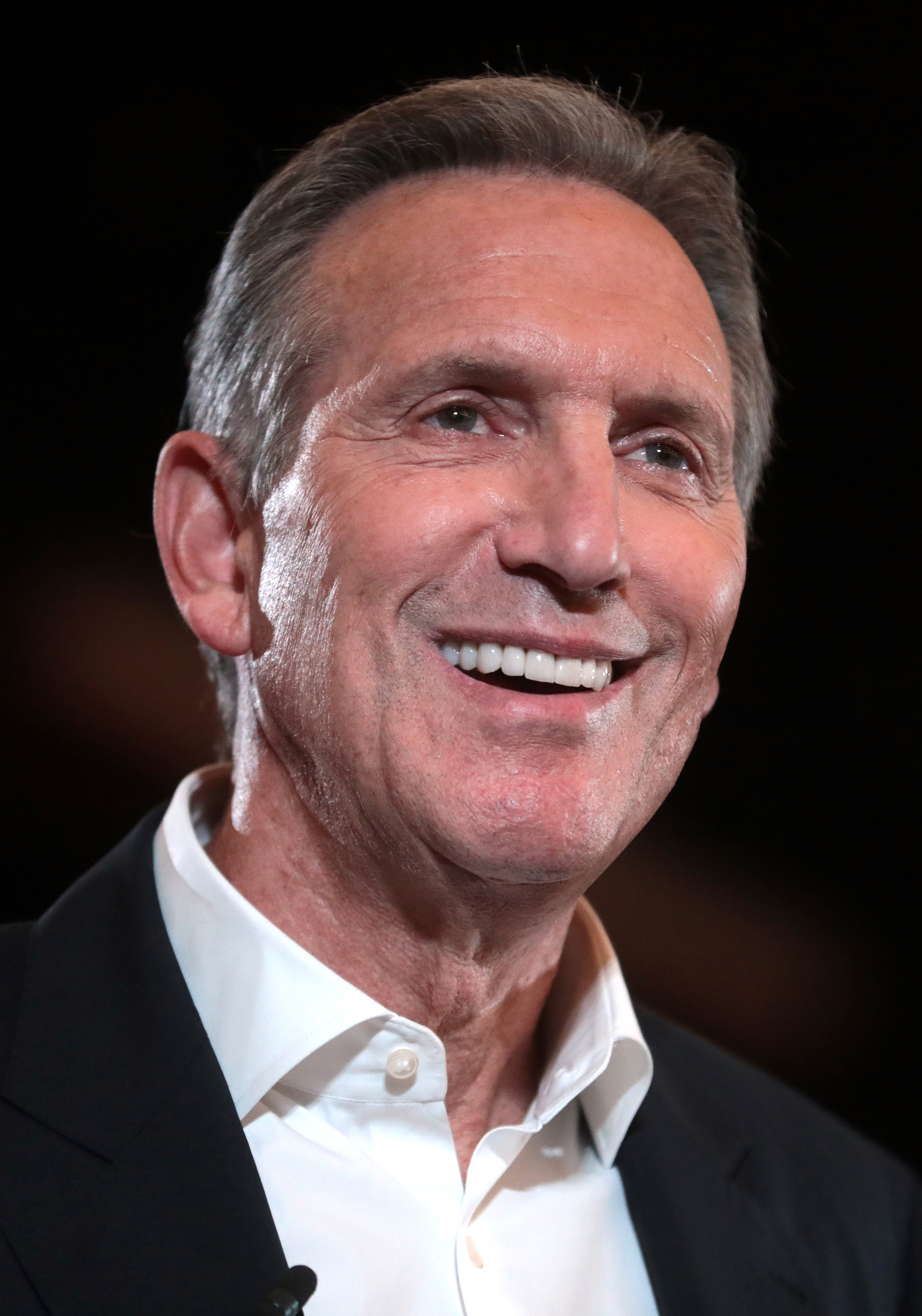
Howard Schultz

== Entertainment ==
Name	Original chapter	Notability	Ref.
24kGoldn	Beta-Sigma / University of Southern California	Rapper who performed hit singles "Valentino" (2019) and "Mood" (2020)	
Ken Albers	Alpha-Mu / Ohio Wesleyan University	Singer for the Four Freshmen quartet	
Jimmy Arnold	Theta / University of Minnesota	Lead singer for The Four Lads quartet	
Ross Barbour	Beta-Rho / University of Akron	Singer for the Four Freshmen quartet	
Tex Beneke	Beta-Tau / Florida Southern College	Saxophonist, singer, and bandleader associated with groups such as the Glenn Miller Orchestra	
Eric Bloom	Kappa-Zeta / Hobart and William Smith Colleges	Lead singer of Blue Öyster Cult	
Tony Butala	Iota-Mu / University of Findlay	Lead singer of The Lettermen trio	
Josh Capon	Beta-Delta / University of Maryland	Chef and television personality that has appeared on Chopped and Bar Rescue	
Paul Comi	Beta-Sigma / University of Southern California	Actor who appeared in over 600 stage, film, and television roles including in The Young Lions (1958), The Twilight Zone (1960–1963), The Towering Inferno (1974), and Howard the Duck (1986)	
Don Cornell	Gamma-Gamma / University of Texas at El Paso	Singer with twelve records that were certified gold which included hit songs "I'm Yours" (1952), "I'll Walk Alone" (1952), and "Hold My Hand" (1953), named to the Hollywood Walk of Fame in 1963	
Chris Cox	Pi-Lambda / University of Nevada, Las Vegas	Dance music record producer, remixer, and DJ	
DougDoug	Nu / University of California, Berkeley	Twitch streamer and YouTuber	
James Drury	Xi-Xi / Texas State University	Actor best known for playing the title role in the 90-minute Western television series The Virginian (1962–1971)	
Brian Duffy	Grand Chapter (Note: There is no associated school with the Grand Chapter. The Grand Chapter is the supreme governing body of Tau Kappa Epsilon Fraternity that meets for biennial international assemblies known as Conclaves where honorary initiations frequently occur.)	Celebrity chef known for appearances on Bar Rescue	
Dan Duryea	Scorpion / Cornell University	Actor best known for playing villain roles and starred in films such as The Woman in the Window (1944), Scarlet Street (1945), and Winchester '73 (1950)	
Don Everly and Phil Everly	Gamma-Rho / Indiana State University	The Everly Brothers, among the first ten artists inducted into the Rock and Roll Hall of Fame and ranked number one by Rolling Stone on its list of the 20 Greatest Duos of All Time	
Arthur Ferrante and Louis Teicher	Epsilon-Sigma / University of Central Oklahoma	Pianists for the Ferrante & Teicher duo who performed top hits "Theme from The Apartment" (1960), "Theme from Exodus" (1961), "Tonight" (1961), and "Midnight Cowboy" (1969)	
Ted Fio Rito	Beta-Xi / Arizona State University	Bandleader, composer, and keyboardist who was popular on national radio broadcasts in the 1920s and 1930s	
Bob Flanigan	Beta-Rho / University of Akron	Singer for the Four Freshmen quartet	
Myron Floren	Beta-Sigma / University of Southern California	Accordionist on The Lawrence Welk Show (1950–1980)	
Travon Free	Delta-Theta / California State University, Long Beach	Writer for Full Frontal with Samantha Bee (2017–2018) and The Daily Show (2012–2015), 2-time Emmy Award winner	
Johnny Grant	Beta-Sigma / University of Southern California	Radio personality and producer, honorary mayor of Hollywood (1980–2008)	
Glen Gray	Alpha-Pi / George Washington University	Jazz saxophonist and leader of the Casa Loma Orchestra	
Merv Griffin	Gamma-Delta / University of Miami	Host of The Merv Griffin Show and creator of the game shows Jeopardy! and Wheel of Fortune	
Robby Hauldren	Beta-Sigma / University of Southern California	Electronic music DJ for the Louis the Child duo best known for their album Here for Now (2020)	
Glenn Hetrick	Omicron-Upsilon / York College of Pennsylvania	Make-up effects artist and judge on Face Off	
DeWayne Jessie	Epsilon-Sigma / University of Central Oklahoma	Actor best known for his portrayal of Otis Day in Animal House (1978)	
Stan Kenton	Gamma / University of Illinois	Pianist and bandleader who created Stan Kenton Band Clinics	
Andrew Lauer	Gamma-Lambda / San Diego State University	Documentary filmmaker and actor best known for playing Charlie on Caroline in the City (1995–1999)	
Freddy Martin	Gamma-Delta Colony / University of Miami	Bandleader and tenor saxophonist whose biggest hit was "Tonight We Love" (1941)	
Bill Melendez	Beta-Sigma / University of Southern California	Character animator, voice actor, film director, and producer best known for his work on the Peanuts animated specials voicing Snoopy and Woodstock	
Buddy Morrow	Delta-Iota / Lenoir–Rhyne University	Trombonist and bandleader, member of The Tonight Show Band in the 1960s, led the Tommy Dorsey Orchestra (1977–2010)	
Willie Nelson	Nu-Xi / Stephen F. Austin State University	Country music songwriter and singer, inducted into the Country Music Hall of Fame in 1993 and featured by Rolling Stone on its 100 Greatest Singers and 100 Greatest Guitarists lists	
Christian I. Nyby II	Alpha-Delta / University of Idaho	Television director best known for his episodes of Hill Street Blues (1981–1987)	
Jameson Parker	Kappa / Beloit College	Actor best known for playing A.J. Simon in the television series Simon & Simon (1981–1989)	
Les Paul	Gamma-Delta / University of Miami	Guitarist and pioneering electric guitar inventor, best known for association with the Gibson Les Paul	
Henry Polic II	Lambda-Iota / Florida State University	Stage, screen, and voice actor, best known as Jerry Silver on Webster (1983–1989)	
Elvis Presley	Beta-Psi / Arkansas State University	Rock 'n' roll pioneer and actor, recognized as the best-selling solo music artist of all time by Guinness World Records having sold over 500 million records worldwide	
Robert Rockwell	Gamma / University of Illinois	Actor best known for playing Philip Boynton in the television series Our Miss Brooks (1952–1956) and the film of the same name, Our Miss Brooks (1956)	
Frank Scott	Delta-Psi / North Dakota State University	Musician of the piano and harpsichord for The Lawrence Welk Show (1956–1969)	
Dave Sheridan	Nu-Omega / William Paterson University	Actor best known for playing Officer Doofy in Scary Movie (2000)	
Tony Siscone	Epsilon-Zeta / Rider University	NASCAR modified stock car racing driver	
Stephen Sommers	Beta-Sigma / University of Southern California	Screenwriter and film director best known for The Mummy (1999) and The Mummy Returns (2001)	
George Sunga	Gamma-Lambda Colony / San Diego State University	Director and producer best known for producing the sitcom television series Three's Company (1977–1984)	
Danny Thomas	Gamma-Nu / University of Toledo	Entertainer and founder of St. Jude Children's Research Hospital	
Charlie Ventura	Kappa / Beloit College	Bandleader and tenor saxophonist who was named the best tenor saxophonist by DownBeat in 1945	
Corey Warning	Zeta-Pi / Culver-Stockton College	Musician, lead singer of the Graduate	
Mark Watters	Beta-Sigma / University of Southern California	Music composer for film and television, winner of six Emmy Awards	
Lawrence Welk	Alpha-Xi / Drake University	Musician and hosted The Lawrence Welk Show (1951–1982)	
Robert Wuhl	Epsilon-Omicron / University of Houston	Actor best known as the creator and star of Arliss (1996–2002) and for playing newspaper reporter Alexander Knox in Batman (1989)	
Zhu	Beta-Sigma / University of Southern California	Electronic music producer and singer whose album Generationwhy (2016) reached number one on Billboard's Dance/Electronic Albums	

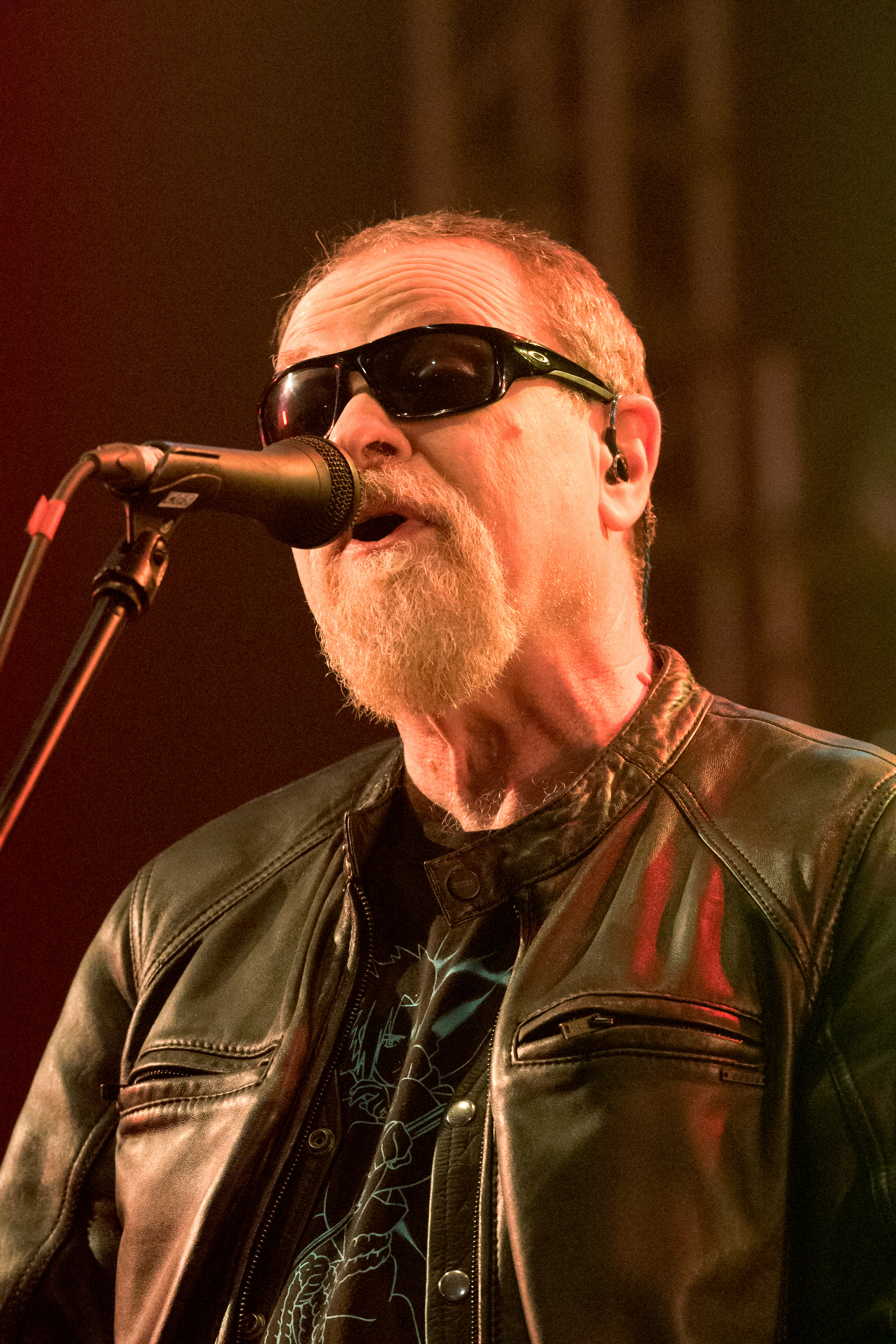
Eric Bloom

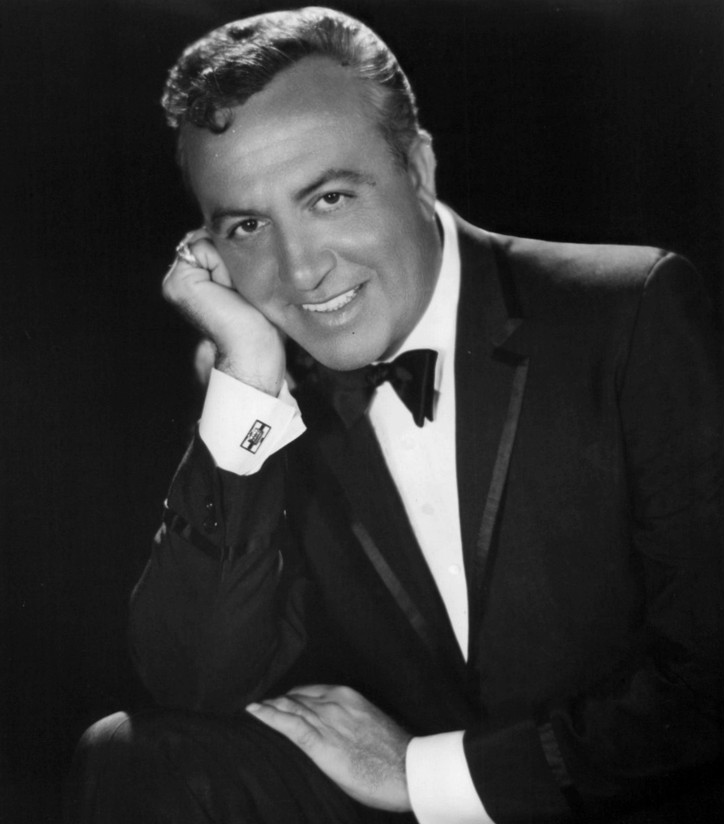
Don Cornell

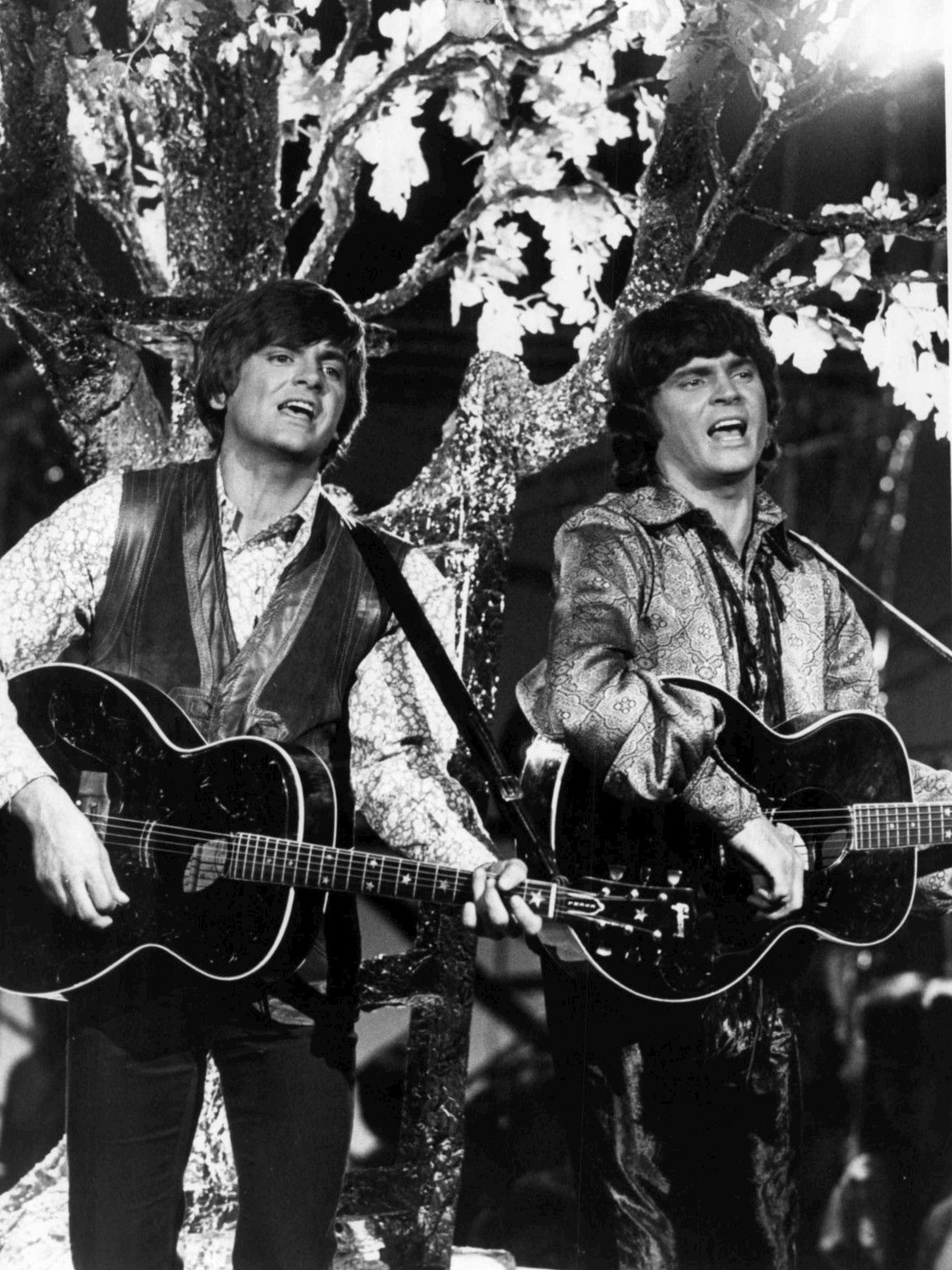
The Everly Brothers

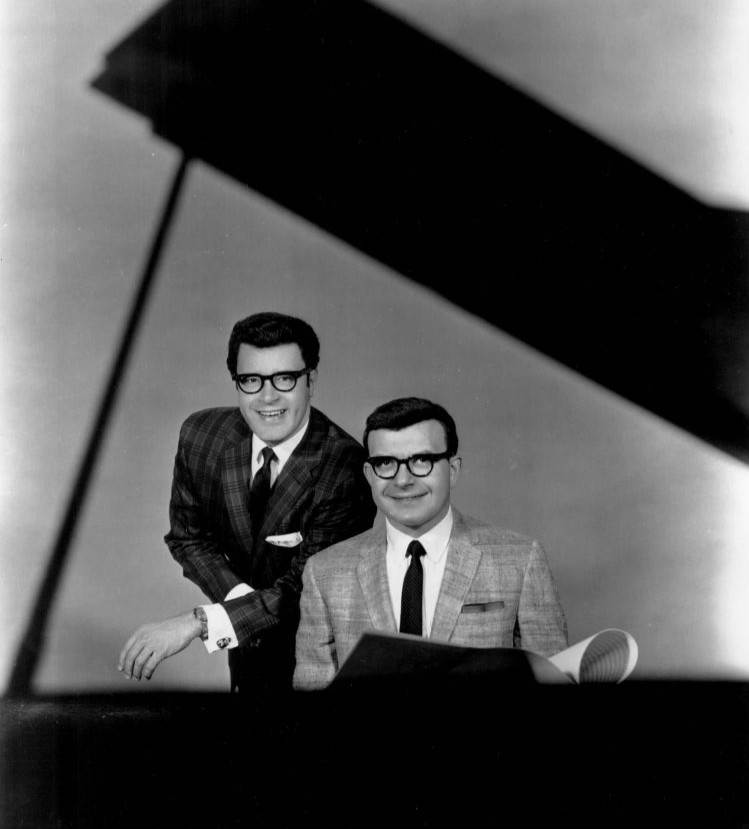
Ferrante & Teicher

Dan Duryea

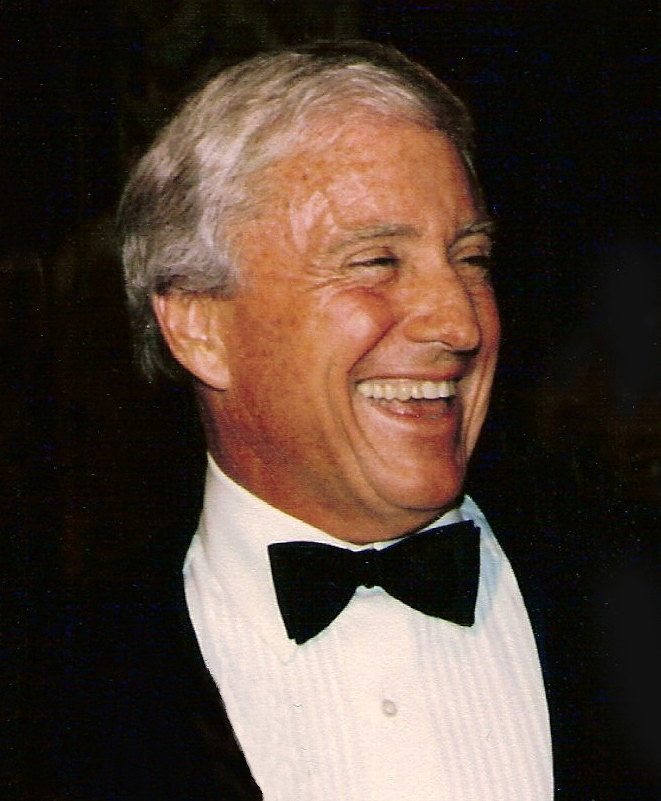
Merv Griffin

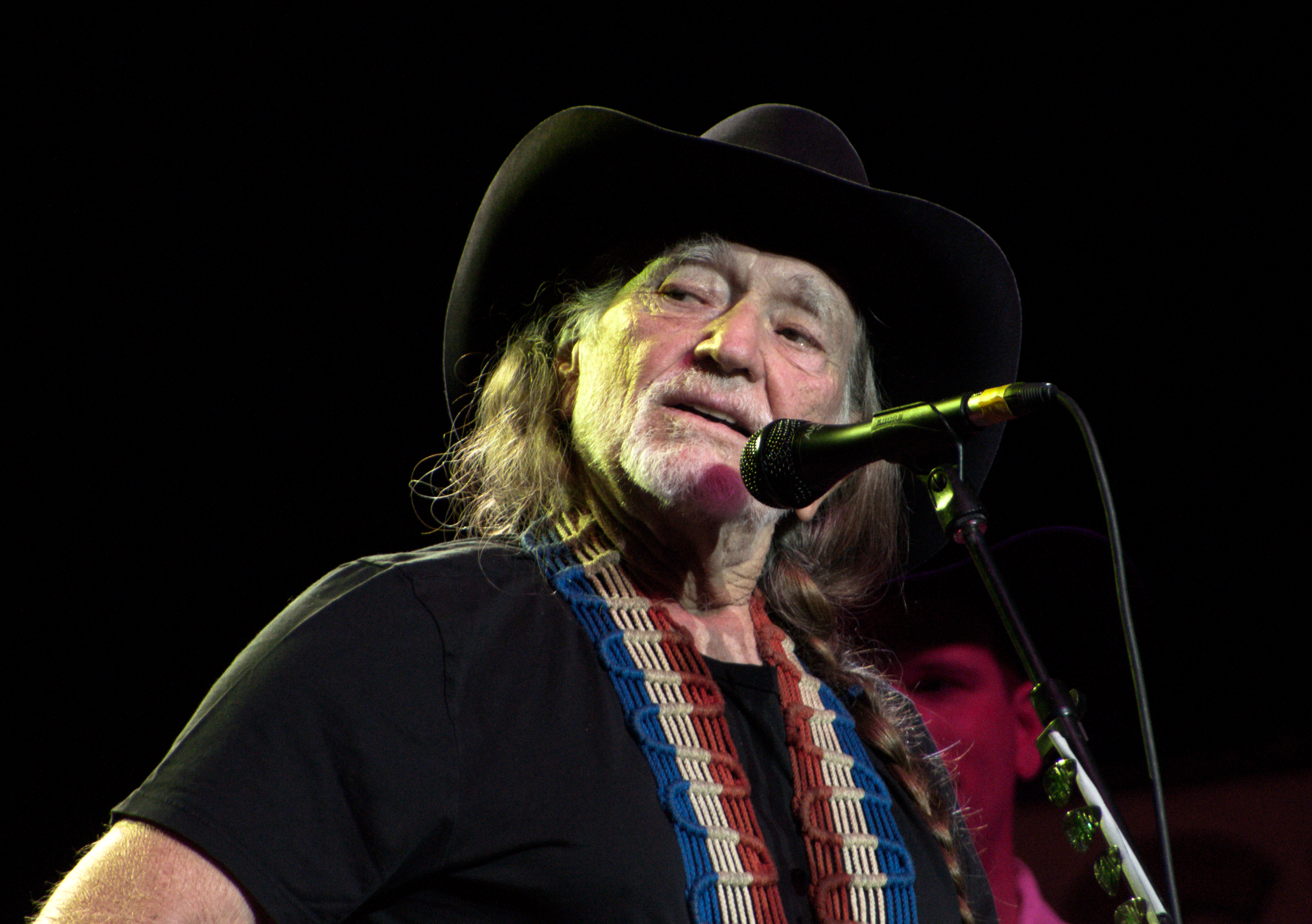
Willie Nelson

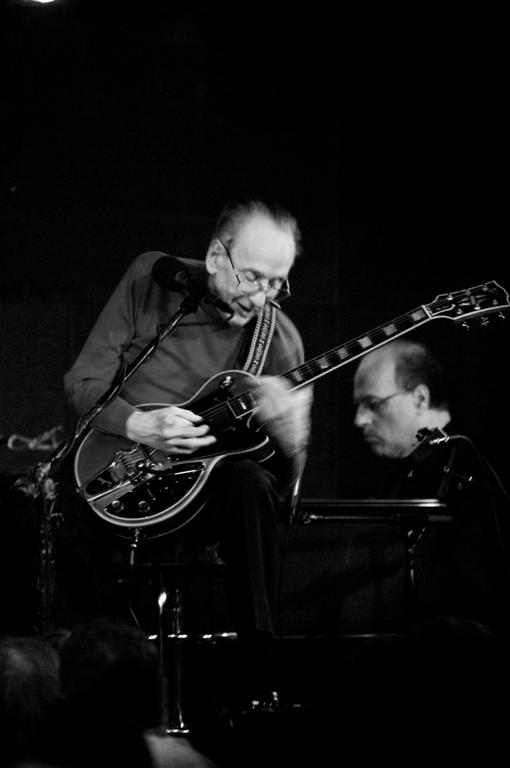
Les Paul

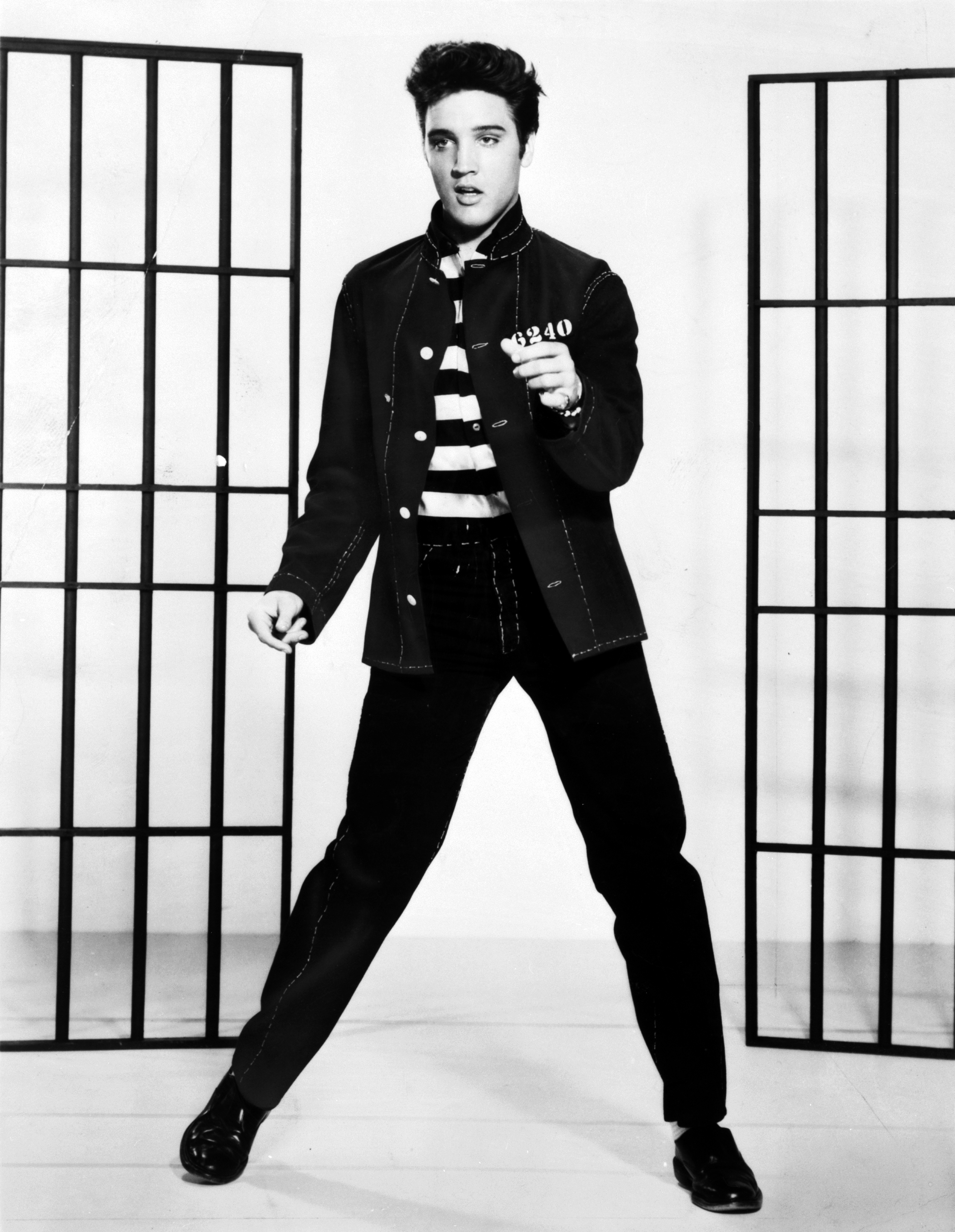
Elvis Presley

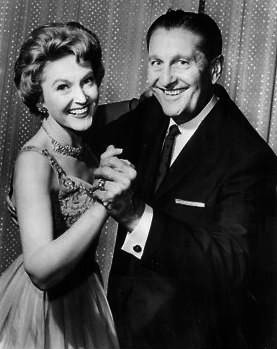
Lawrence Welk

== Journalism and broadcasting ==
Name	Original chapter	Notability	Ref.
Lowell Blanchard	Gamma / University of Illinois	Radio personality for WNOX in Knoxville, Tennessee, inducted into the Country Music DJ Hall of Fame in 1977	
Irv Brown	Delta-Delta / University of Northern Colorado	Sports broadcaster on radio for the Denver Nuggets and the Colorado Avalanche, former sports analyst for NBA on ESPN	
Steve Forbes	Grand Chapter	CEO and president of Forbes Inc. and editor-in-chief of Forbes magazine (1990–present), campaigned in the 1996 Republican Party presidential primaries and 2000 Republican Party presidential primaries	
Christopher Glenn	Gamma-Iota / University of Colorado Boulder	Radio and television news journalist for CBS best known for his live coverage of the Space Shuttle Challenger disaster (1986)	
David R. Jones	Pi / Pennsylvania State University	Newspaper journalist and editor for The Wall Street Journal and The New York Times, recipient of two Gerald Loeb Awards for excellence in business and financial journalism	
Sean McLaughlin	Epsilon / Iowa State University	Chief meteorologist for MSNBC (2004–2006) and KPHO in Phoenix, Arizona (2009–2020)	
Bill Owen	Beta-Sigma / University of Southern California	Host and announcer for the TV series Discovery (1966–1971), announcer for ABC's World News This Morning (1982–1990)	
Bill Plante	Epsilon-Kappa / Loyola University Chicago	CBS News White House correspondent and reporter for over 50 years who also anchored CBS Sunday Night News (1988–1995)	
Neil Reagan	Iota / Eureka College	Radio broadcaster, CBS senior producer, and advertising executive, older brother of President Ronald Reagan	
Anish Shroff	Iota-Zeta / Syracuse University	ESPN on-air host and commentator, play-by-play announcer on radio for the Carolina Panthers	
Joe Tait	Alpha-Epsilon / Monmouth College	Sports broadcaster who was the play-by-play announcer on radio for the Cleveland Cavaliers and both TV and radio for the Cleveland Indians	

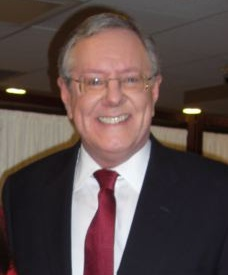
Steve Forbes

== Law ==
Name	Original chapter	Notability	Ref.
John R. Gibson	Beta-Theta / University of Missouri	Federal circuit judge with the United States Court of Appeals for the Eighth Circuit (1982–1994), federal district judge with the United States District Court for the Western District of Missouri (1981–1982)	
David R. Hansen	Delta-Nu / Northwest Missouri State University	Federal circuit judge with the United States Court of Appeals for the Eighth Circuit (1991–2003), federal district judge with the United States District Court for the Northern District of Iowa (1986–1991)	
George Evan Howell	Gamma / University of Illinois	Judge of the United States Court of Claims (1947–1953), U.S. Representative from Illinois (1941–1947)	
George M. Marovich	Gamma / University of Illinois	Federal district judge with the United States District Court for the Northern District of Illinois (1988–2000)	
D. Price Marshall Jr.	Beta-Psi / Arkansas State University	Federal district judge with the United States District Court for the Eastern District of Arkansas (2010–present)	
James Keith Singleton Jr.	Nu / University of California, Berkeley	Federal district judge with the United States District Court for the District of Alaska (1990–2005)	
Charles E. Whittaker	Alpha-Phi / University of Kansas	U.S. Supreme Court Justice (1957–1962), federal circuit judge with the United States Court of Appeals for the Eighth Circuit (1956–1957)	

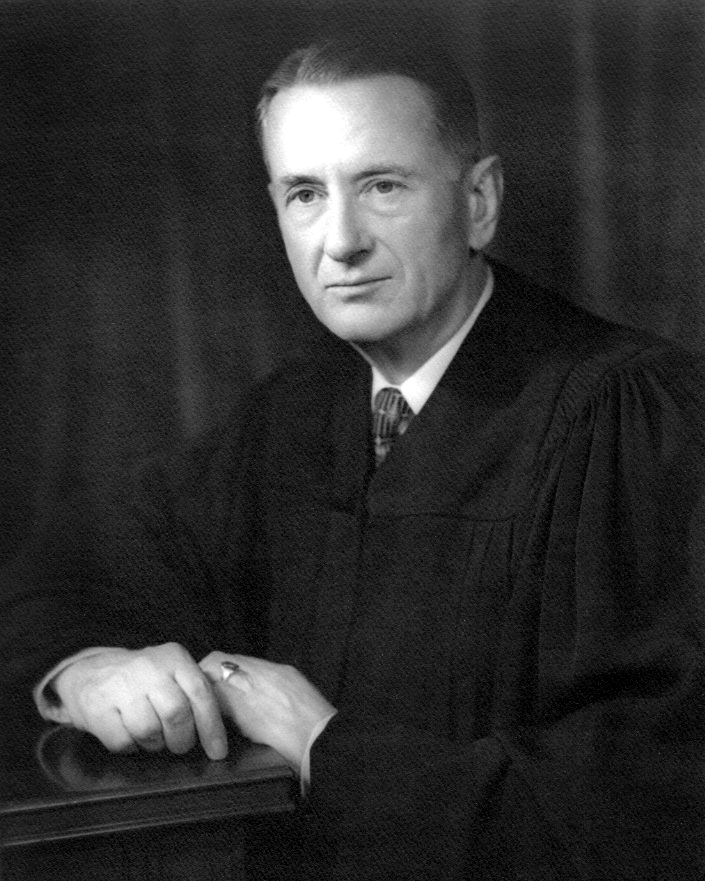
Charles Whittaker

== Literature ==
Name	Original chapter	Notability	Ref.
Jim Barnes	Epsilon-Theta / Southeastern Oklahoma State University	Poet Laureate of Oklahoma (2009–2010), editor of the Chariton Review (1976–2010)	
James Blish	Alpha-Eta / Rutgers University	Science fiction and fantasy writer best known for the Cities in Flight series (1950–1962) and his series of Star Trek novelizations, credited with creating the term gas giant	
Robert Coover	Beta-Chi / Southern Illinois University Carbondale	Fabulation and metafiction writer best known for The Public Burning (1977), co-founded the Electronic Literature Organization	
Harry Golden	Theta-Beta / Belmont Abbey College	Political and civil rights writer best known for his book Only in America (1958)	
William Least Heat-Moon	Beta-Theta / University of Missouri	New York Times bestselling travel author best known for Blue Highways (1982)	
Bill Hinds	Nu-Xi / Stephen F. Austin State University	Sports cartoonist best known for Tank McNamara (1974–present) and Cleats (2001–2010)	
Dayton Hyde	Nu / University of California, Berkeley	Expository author, proponent of nature conservation, and operated an 11,000-acre sanctuary for wild horses	
James C. Logan	Xi / Washington University in St. Louis	Co-authored legal volumes for Missouri Practice Methods, authored leading law articles, and Grand Prytanis (Grand President) of Tau Kappa Epsilon (1953–1957)	
Bruce Maccabee	Zeta-Mu / Worcester Polytechnic Institute	Author and researcher best known for technical articles and books on UFOs	
Frederick Gale Ruffner Jr.	Omicron / Ohio State University	Publisher, founded Gale Research and Omnigraphics	
John A. Russo	Rho / West Virginia University	Screenwriter for Night of the Living Dead (1968)	
Frederick J. Schlink	Gamma / University of Illinois	Consumer rights activist known for co-writing the books Your Money's Worth (1927) and 100,000,000 Guinea Pigs (1933), co-founded the group Consumers' Research	
William L. Shirer	Zeta / Coe College	Journalist, war correspondent, historian, and author of The Rise and Fall of the Third Reich (1960)	
Robert Tinnell	Theta-Delta / Fairmont State University	Film screenwriter, director, producer, and author best known for horror graphic novels including The Black Forest (2004), The Wicked West (2004), The Living and the Dead (2005), and Sight Unseen (2006)	

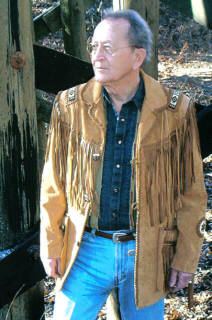
Jim Barnes

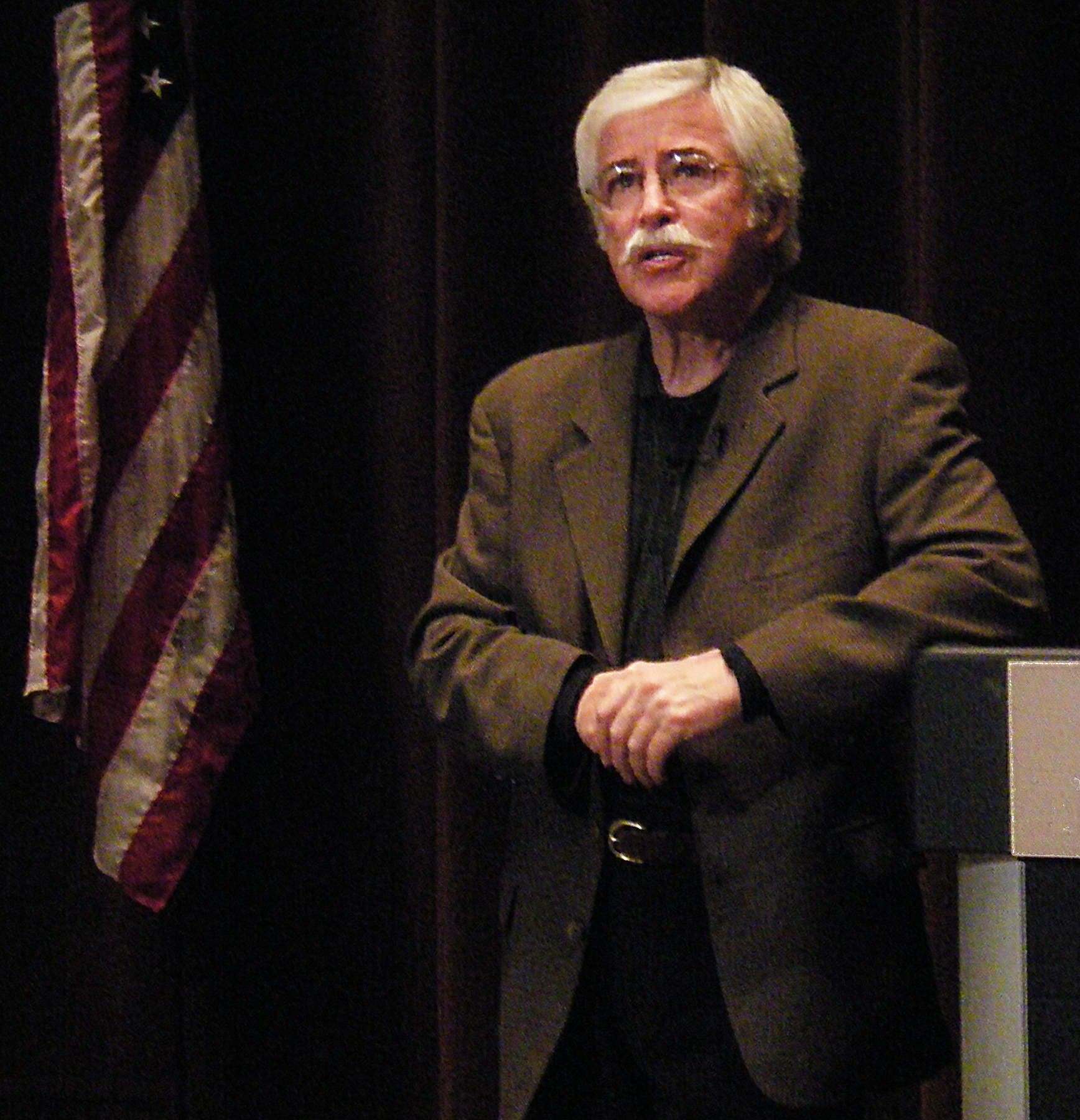
William Least Heat-Moon

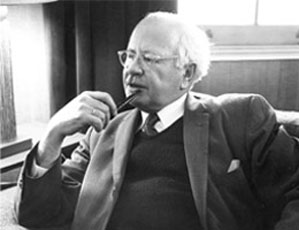
William L. Shirer

== Military ==
Name	Original chapter	Notability	Ref.
Earl E. Anderson	Rho / West Virginia University	General, U.S. Marine Corps, youngest active duty Marine ever promoted to the rank of 4-star General, recipient of the Navy Distinguished Service Medal, Legion of Merit, Purple Heart, Bronze Star, and Distinguished Flying Cross	
Terrence R. Dake	Theta-Xi / University of Arkansas	General, U.S. Marine Corps, Assistant Commandant of the Marine Corps (1998–2000), Vietnam War and Gulf War veteran, recipient of the Defense Superior Service Medal, Legion of Merit, and Air Medal	
Roy K. Flint	Omega / Albion College	Brigadier general, U.S. Army, dean of the academic board at the United States Military Academy (1985–1990), president of the Society for Military History (1994–1997)	
David P. Fridovich	Delta / Knox College	Lieutenant General, U.S. Army, Commander of Special Operations Command Pacific (2005–2007), Director of the Center for Special Operations for U.S. Special Operations Command (2007–2010), Deputy Commander of U.S. Special Operations Command (2010–2011)	
Loyal M. Haynes	Delta / Knox College	Brigadier General, U.S. Army, Commanding General of the 2nd Infantry Division Artillery during the Korean War, awarded the Distinguished Service Medal for his exploits during World War II	
Frank J. Jirka Jr.	Delta / Knox College	Lieutenant, U.S. Navy, president of the American Medical Association (1983–1984), served during World War II and was awarded the Silver Star and Purple Heart after being wounded in the Battle of Iwo Jima, which resulted in both legs being amputated below the knee	
Irving P. Krick	Nu / University of California, Berkeley	One of the U.S. Air Force meteorologists who provided forecasts for the Normandy Landings in 1944, started the first private weather business in the United States in 1938	
Hugh M. Milton II	Alpha-Omicron / New Mexico State University	Major General, U.S. Army, Assistant Secretary of the Army (1953–1958), United States Under Secretary of the Army (1958–1961), President of New Mexico State University (1938–1941, 1947–1953)	
Dan C. Ogle	Iota / Eureka College	Major General, U.S. Air Force, served as the 3rd Surgeon General of the United States Air Force (1954–1958)	
Joseph W. Ralston	Delta-Xi / Miami University	General, U.S. Air Force, Vice Chairman of the Joint Chiefs of Staff (1996–2000), Supreme Allied Commander of NATO (2000–2003)	
Jerry R. Rutherford	Delta-Mu / Pittsburg State University	Lieutenant General, U.S. Army, Commanding General of V Corps (1992–1995)	
Tim Vakoc	Theta-Rho / St. Cloud State University	Chaplain, U.S. Army, first chaplain to die of wounds sustained during Operation Iraqi Freedom	
Charles Whittington	Pi-Psi / University of Southern Mississippi	Major General, U.S. Army, Director of the International Security Assistance Force (2011–2012), First Army Deputy Commanding General of Operations (2015–2019)	
R. C. Williams	Alpha-Pi / George Washington University	Rear Admiral, U.S. Public Health Service, Chief Medical Officer of the Farm Security Administration (1936–1942) and Assistant Surgeon General (1943–1951)	

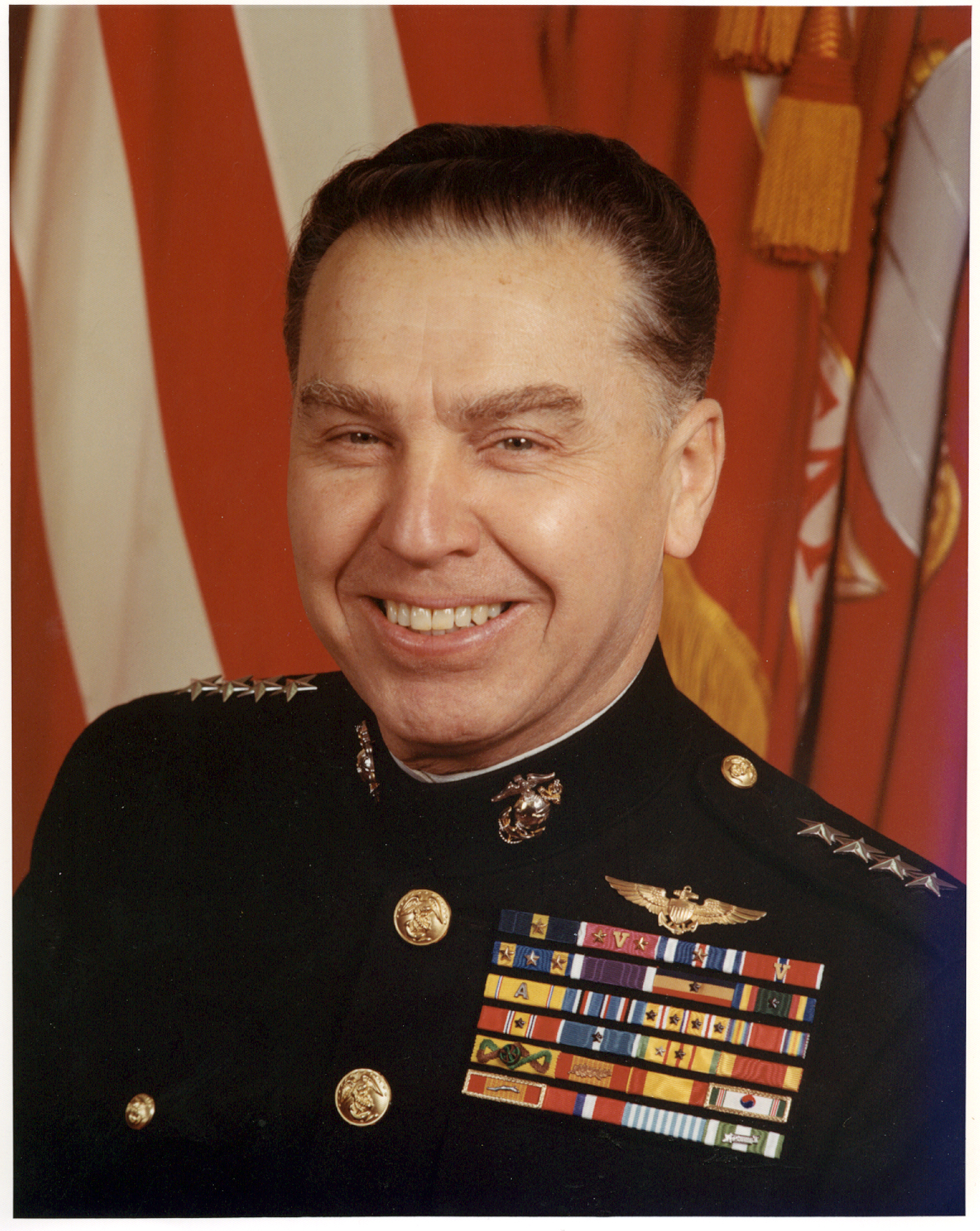
GEN Earl E. Anderson

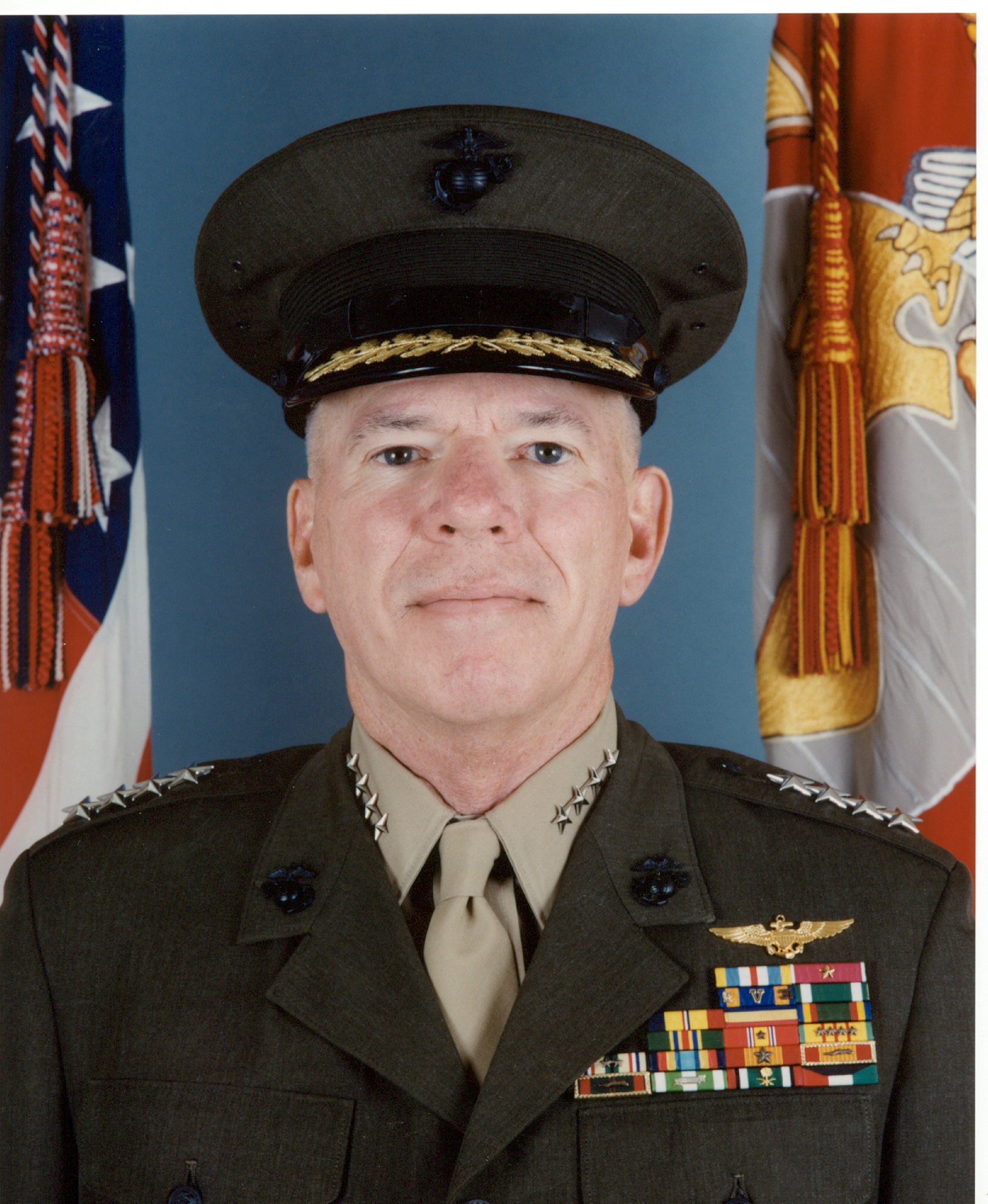
GEN Terrence R. Dake

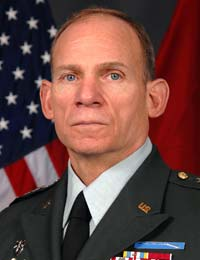
LTG David P. Fridovich

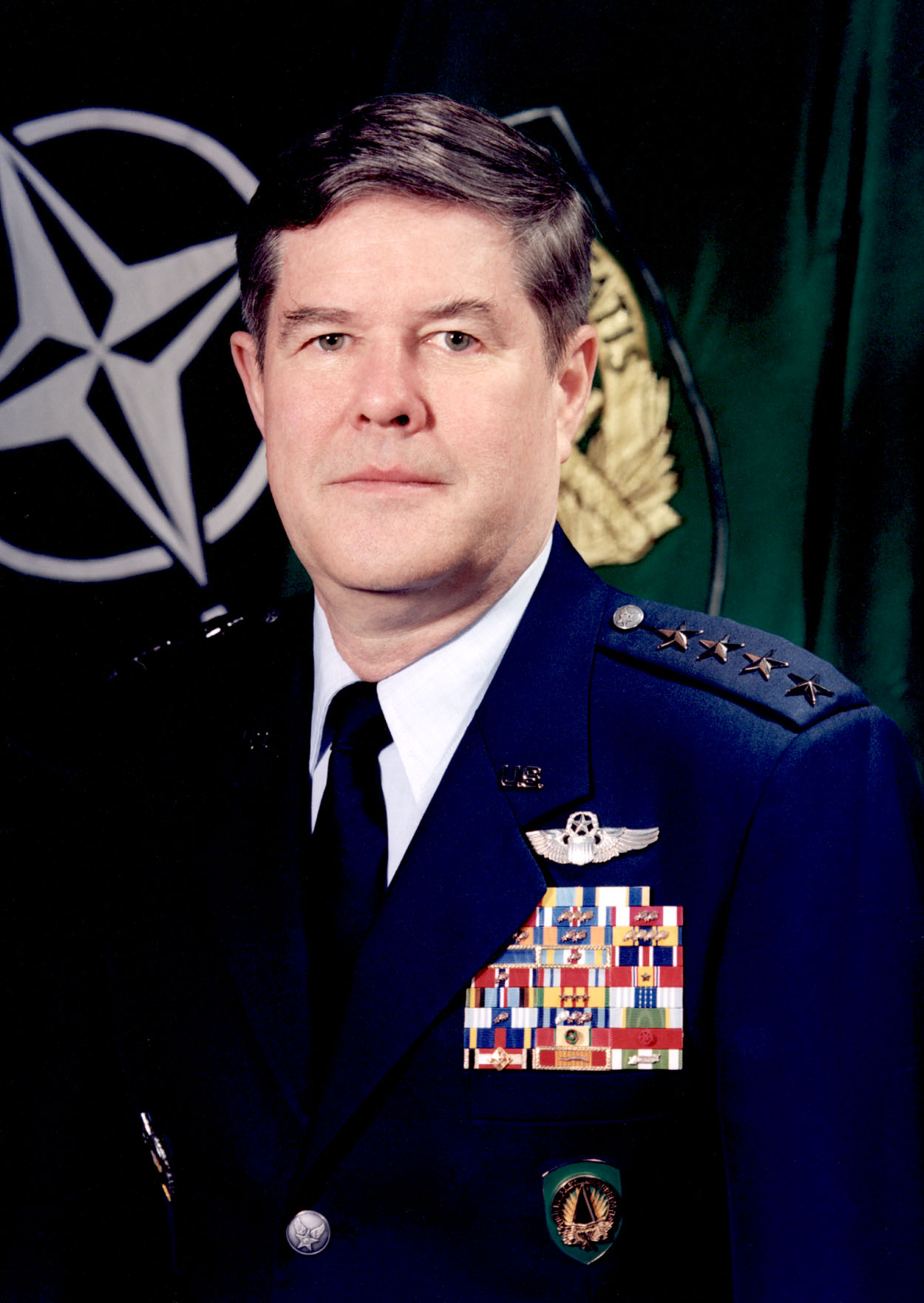
GEN Joseph W. Ralston

== Politics ==
=== President of the United States ===
Name	Original chapter	Notability	Ref.
Ronald Reagan	Iota / Eureka College	40th President of the United States, 33rd Governor of California, actor	

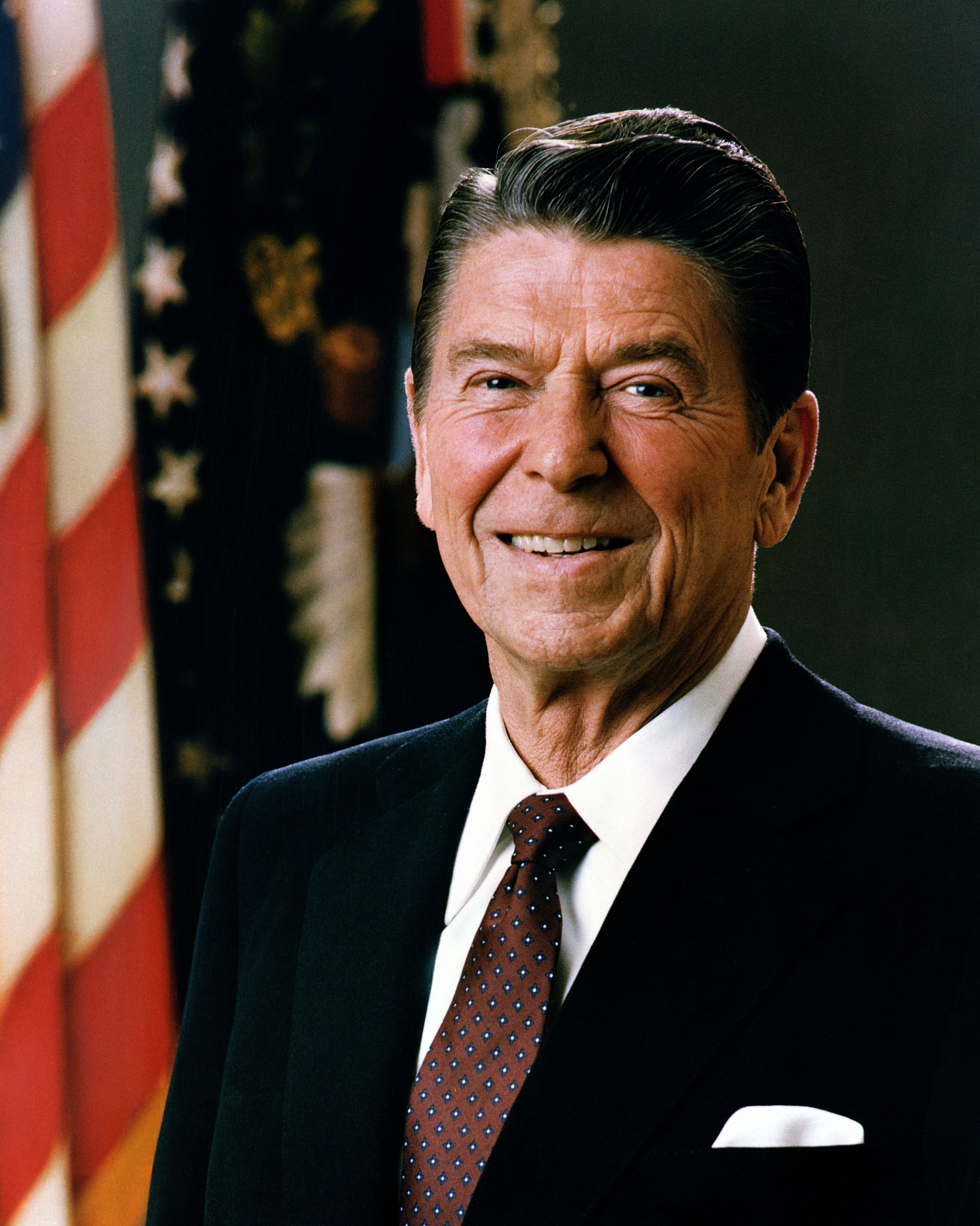
Ronald W. Reagan

=== U.S. Senate ===
Name	Original chapter	Notability	Ref.
Robert Byrd	Alpha-Pi / George Washington University	U.S. Senator from West Virginia (1959–2010), U.S. Representative from West Virginia (1953–1959)	
Lester C. Hunt	Alpha / Illinois Wesleyan University	U.S. Senator from Wyoming (1949–1954), 19th Governor of Wyoming (1943–1949)	
Roger Jepsen	Beta-Xi / Arizona State University	U.S. Senator from Iowa (1979–1985), Lieutenant Governor of Iowa (1969–1973), Iowa State Senator (1966–1968)	
Richard Stone	Lambda-Iota / Florida State University	U.S. Senator from Florida (1975–1980), U.S. Ambassador-at-Large to Central America (1983–1984), U.S Ambassador to Denmark (1991–1993)	

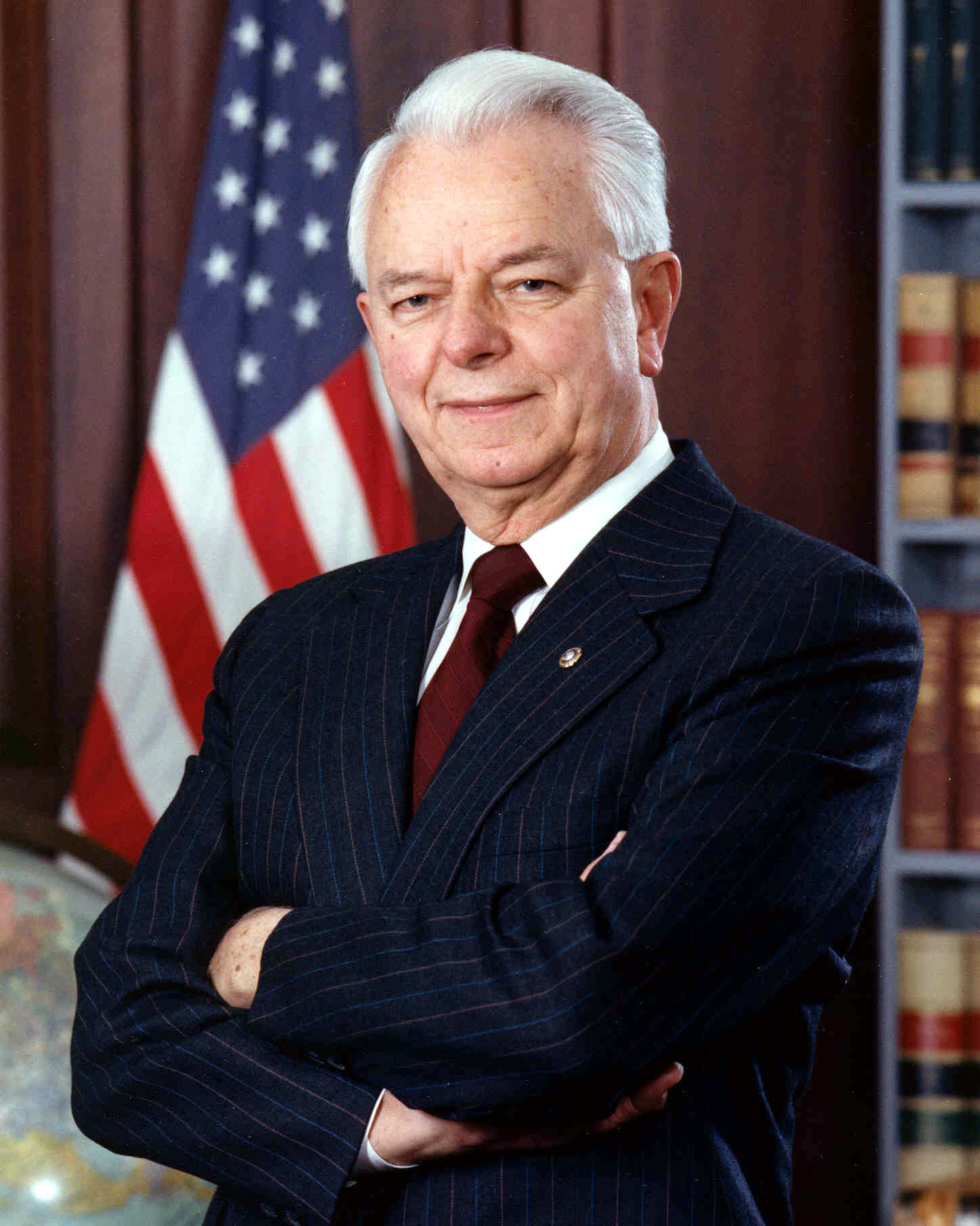
Robert C. Byrd

=== U.S. House of Representatives ===
Name	Original chapter	Notability	Ref.
Wendell Bailey	Beta-Omega / Missouri State University	U.S. Representative from Missouri (1981–1983), 41st State Treasurer of Missouri (1985–1993)	
Bob Barr	Beta-Sigma / University of Southern California	U.S. Representative from Georgia (1995–2003), Libertarian Party, nominee for the 2008 presidential election, Grand Prytanis (Grand President) of Tau Kappa Epsilon (2013–2015)	
William K. Brewster	Epsilon-Eta / Southwestern Oklahoma State University	U.S. Representative from Oklahoma (1991–1997)	
Quico Canseco	Epsilon-Alpha / Saint Louis University	U.S. Representative from Texas (2011–2013)	
Jeffrey Paul Hillelson	Beta-Theta / University of Missouri	U.S. Representative from Missouri (1953–1955), Regional Administrator of the GSA (1969–1974)	
Joe Knollenberg	Gamma-Omega / Eastern Illinois University	U.S. Representative from Michigan (1993–2009)	
John R. Miller	Beta-Mu / Bucknell University	U.S. Representative from Washington (1985–1993)	
Sid Morrison	Alpha-Gamma / Washington State University	U.S. Representative from Washington (1981–1993), Washington State Senator (1975–1980), member of the Washington House of Representatives (1967–1975)	
Richard Neal	Kappa-Iota / University of Hartford	U.S. Representative from Massachusetts (1989–present)	
Earl Pomeroy	Xi-Pi / Valley City State University	U.S. Representative from North Dakota (1993–2011)	
Carl Pursell	Delta-Pi / Eastern Michigan University	U.S. Representative from Michigan (1977–1993)	
Jimmy Quillen	Pi-Gamma / East Tennessee State University	U.S. Representative from Tennessee (1963–1997)	
Mark Schauer	Omega / Albion College	U.S. Representative from Michigan (2009–2011)	
Billy Tauzin	Mu-Zeta / Nicholls State University	U.S. Representative from Louisiana (1980–2005)	
Wes Watkins	Beta-Gamma / Oklahoma State University	U.S. Representative from Oklahoma (1977–1991, 1997–2003)	
Daniel Webster	Beta-Pi / Georgia Institute of Technology	U.S. Representative from Florida (2011–present)	

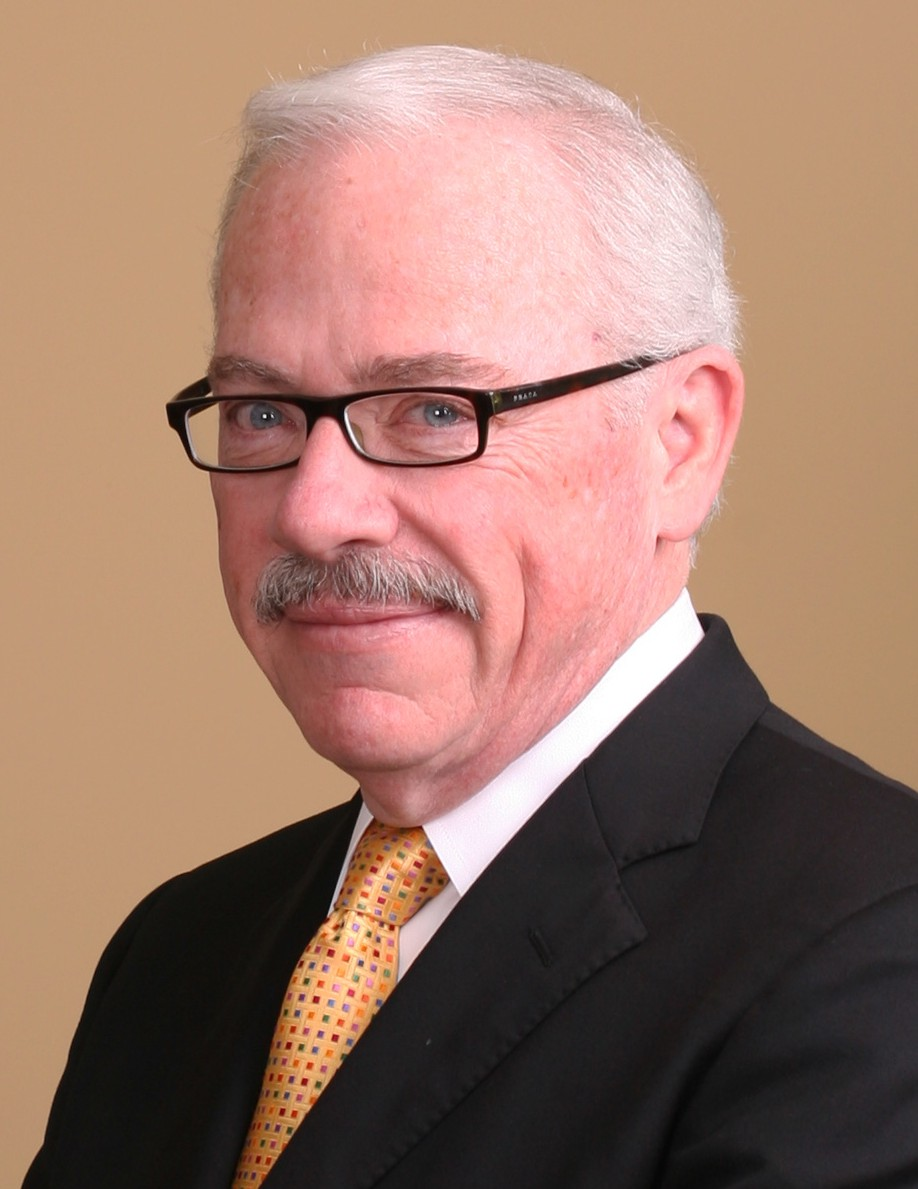
Bob Barr

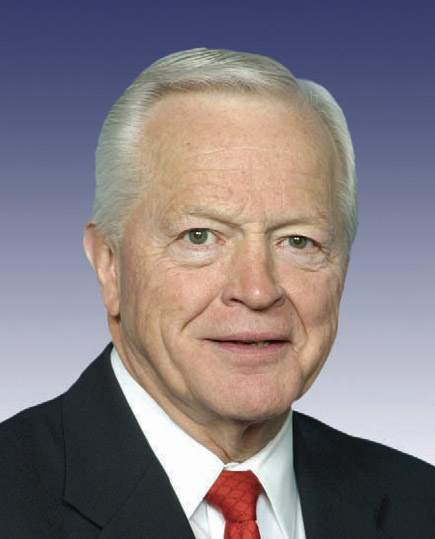
Joe Knollenberg

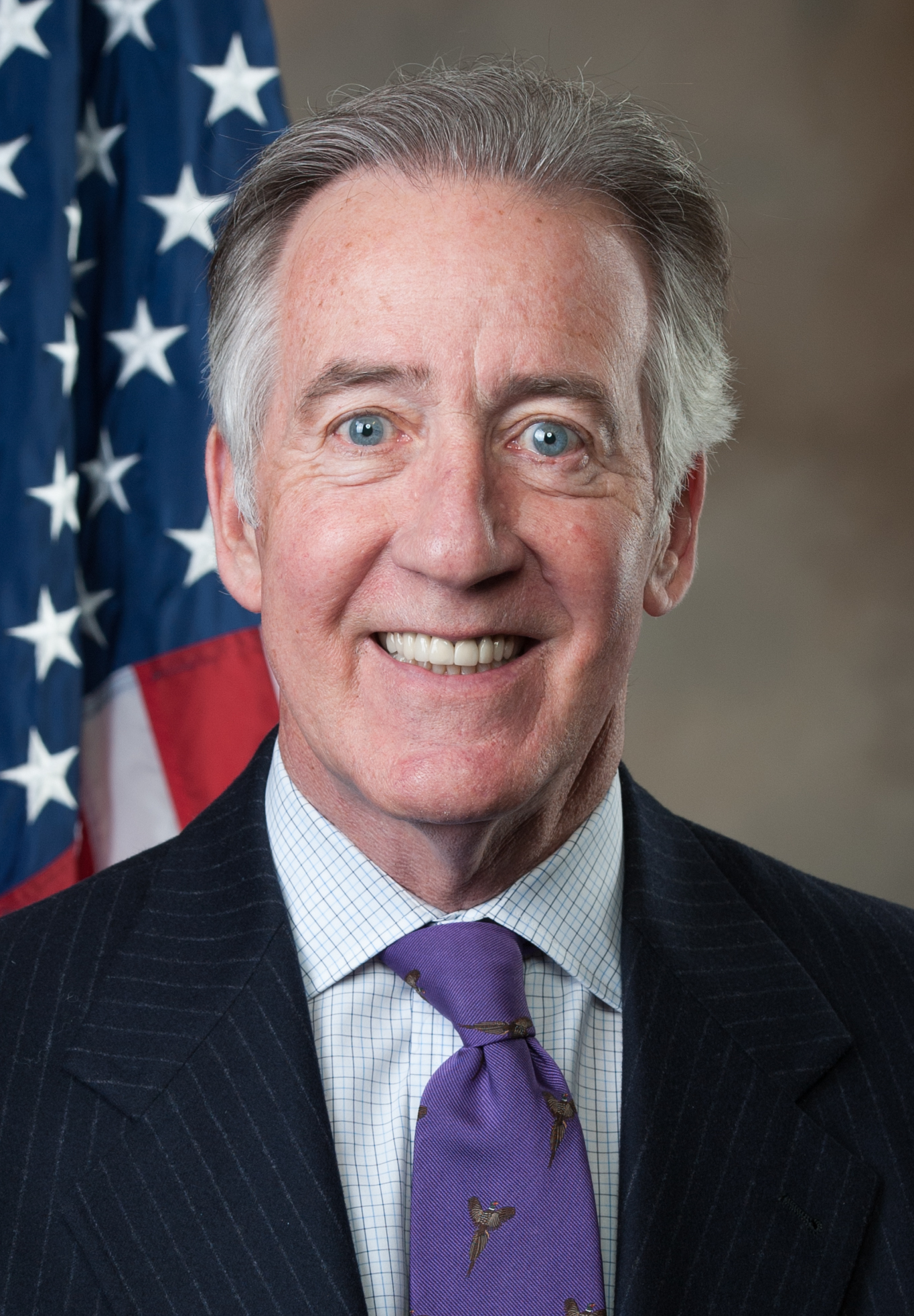
Richard Neal

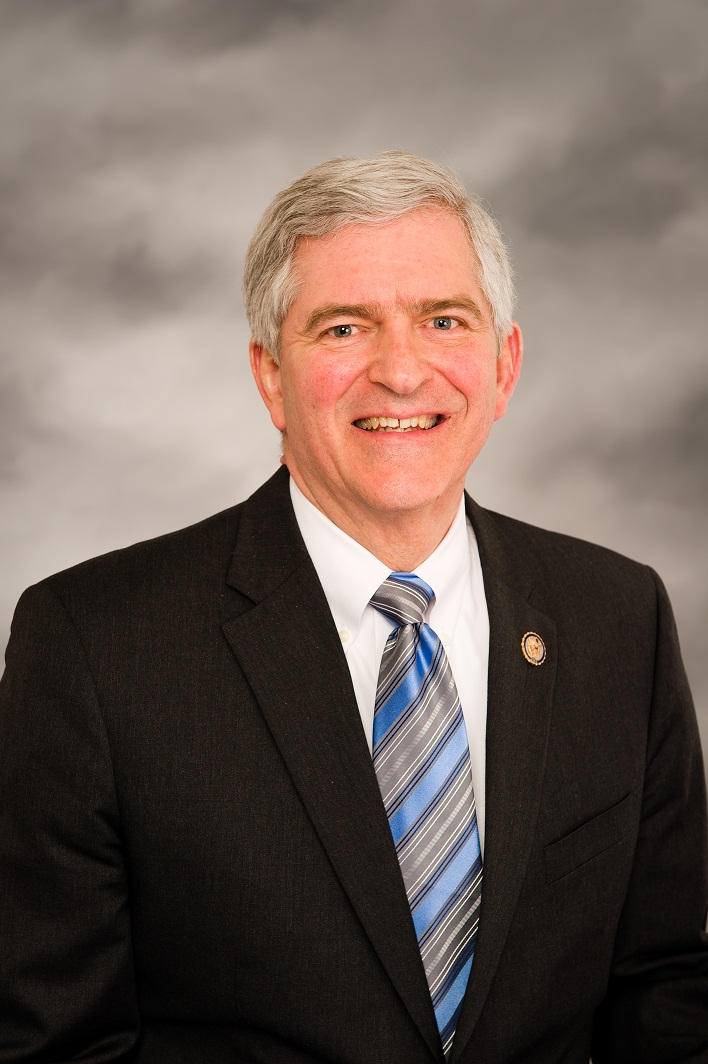
Daniel Webster

=== Agency executives and ambassadors ===
Name	Original chapter	Notability	Ref.
James W. Carr	Lambda-Iota / Florida State University	Commissioner on the United States Commission on International Religious Freedom (2020–2022), member of the National Security Education Board (2005–2011)	
Ray Chambers	Theta-Zeta / Rutgers University–Newark	United Nations Secretary-General's Special Envoy for Health in Agenda 2030 and for Malaria, named by Time magazine as one of the 100 most influential people in the world	
Ryan Crocker	Alpha-Theta / Whitman College	U.S. Ambassador to Afghanistan (2011–2012), Iraq (2007–2009), Pakistan (2004–2007), Syria (1998–2001), Kuwait (1994–1997), and Lebanon (1990–1993), recipient of the Presidential Medal of Freedom	
William G. Hyland	Xi / Washington University in St. Louis	Director of the Bureau of Intelligence and Research (1974–1975), Deputy National Security Advisor (1975–1977)	
Daniel R. Levinson	Beta-Sigma / University of Southern California	Inspector General of the Department of Health and Human Services (2004–2019)	
Brian D. Montgomery	Gamma-Upsilon / University of Texas at Austin	United States Deputy Secretary of Housing and Urban Development (2020–2021), Assistant Secretary of Housing and Urban Development for Housing (2005–2009, 2018–2020), White House Cabinet Secretary (2003–2005)	
Edmund C. Moy	Lambda / University of Wisconsin–Madison	38th Director of the United States Mint (2006–2011), Vice President Corporate Infrastructure, L&L Energy, Inc., Grand Prytanis (Grand President) of Tau Kappa Epsilon (2011–2013)	
Alan C. Nelson	Nu / University of California, Berkeley	12th Commissioner of the Immigration and Naturalization Service (1982–1989)	
James W. Pardew	Beta-Psi Colony / Arkansas State University	U.S. Ambassador to Bulgaria (2002–2005)	
Joseph J. Sisco	Delta / Knox College	Assistant Secretary of State for International Organization Affairs (1965–1969), Assistant Secretary of State for Near Eastern Affairs (1969–1974)	
Donald Tapia	Sigma-Theta / Saint Leo University	U.S. Ambassador to Jamaica (2019–2021)	
Brian Wansink	Lambda-Chi / Wayne State College	Executive Director of USDA's Center for Nutrition Policy and Promotion (2007–2009), professor of Applied Economics and Management at Cornell University (2005–2018)	
Earl Anthony Wayne	Nu / University of California, Berkeley	U.S. Ambassador to Mexico (2011–2015) and Argentina (2007–2009), Assistant Secretary of State for Economic and Business Affairs (2000–2006)	

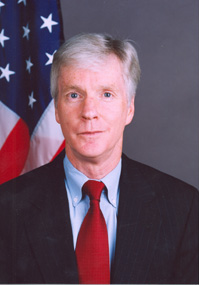
Ryan Crocker

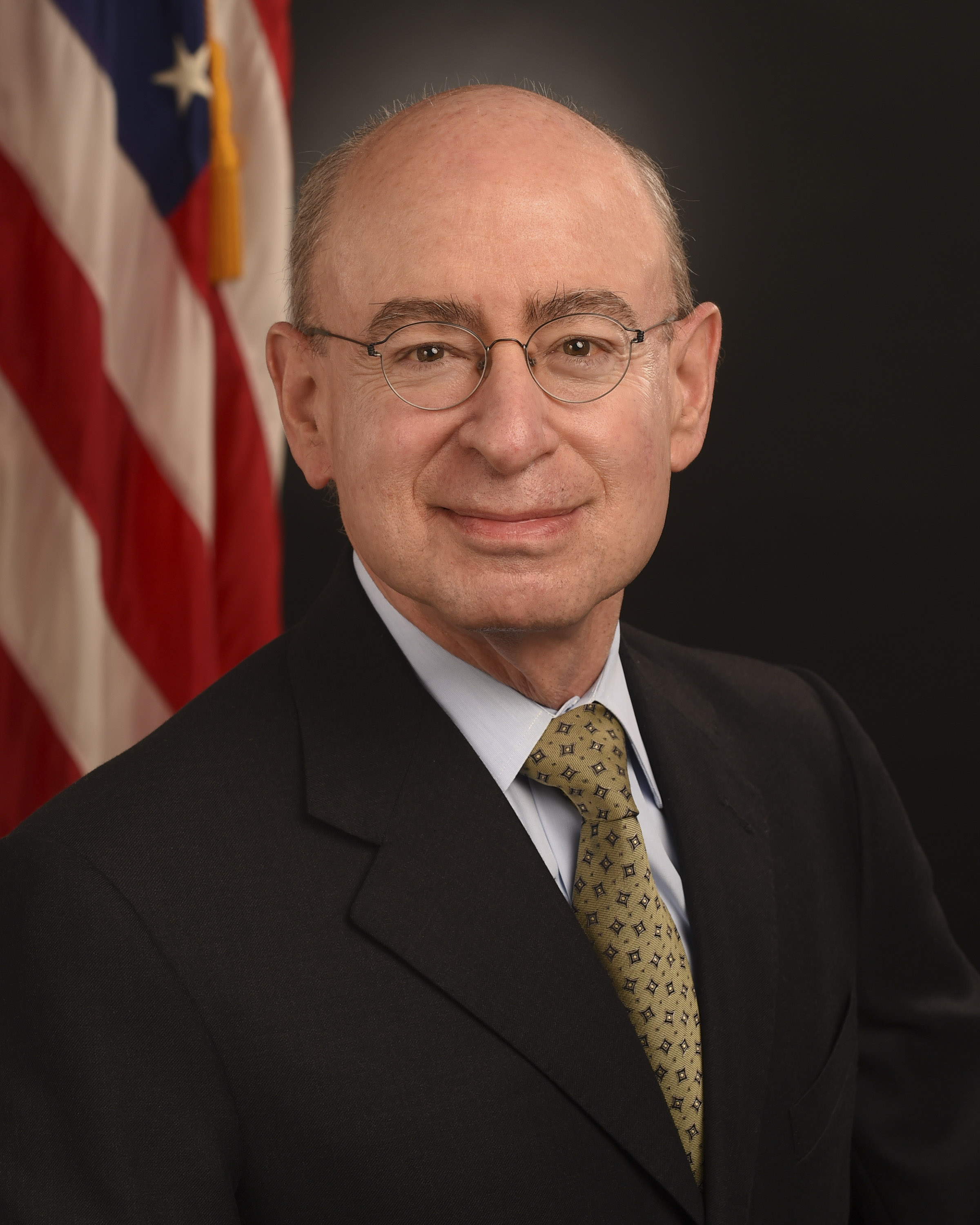
Daniel R. Levinson

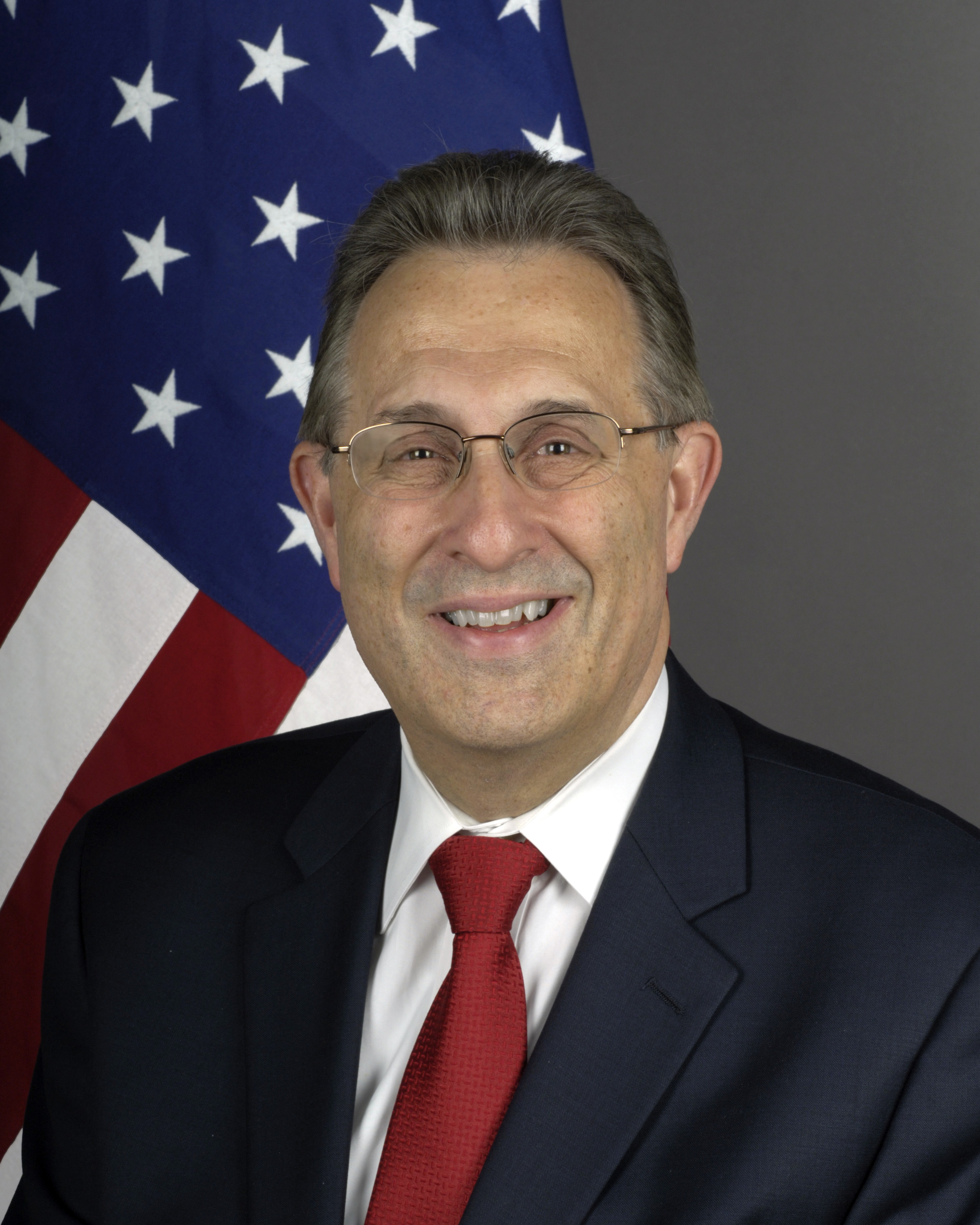
Earl A. Wayne

=== Canadian government ===
Name	Original chapter	Notability	Ref.
Gary Doer	Zeta-Iota / University of Manitoba	20th Premier of Manitoba (1999–2009), Canadian Ambassador to the United States (2009–2016)	

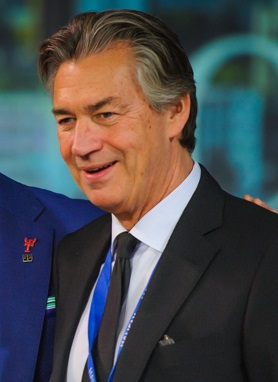
Gary Doer

=== Governors ===
Name	Original chapter	Notability	Ref.
Mike Huckabee	Beta-Psi / Arkansas State University	44th Governor of Arkansas (1996–2007), 2008 Republican presidential candidate, host of Huckabee on Fox News (2008–2015), host of The Mike Huckabee Show radio program (2012–2013), 2016 Republican presidential candidate	
George M. Leader	Psi / Gettysburg College	36th Governor of Pennsylvania (1955–1959)	
Frank B. Morrison	Alpha-Lambda / Kansas State University	31st Governor of Nebraska (1961–1967)	
Mike O'Callaghan	Alpha-Delta / University of Idaho	23rd Governor of Nevada (1971–1979)	
Albert Rosellini	Chi / University of Washington	15th Governor of Washington (1957–1965)	
John G. Rowland	Kappa-Upsilon / Villanova University	86th Governor of Connecticut (1995–2004)	
Martin J. Schreiber	Zeta-Zeta / University of Wisconsin–Milwaukee	39th Governor of Wisconsin (1977–1979)	

Mike Huckabee

=== State government ===
Name	Original chapter	Notability	Ref.
Lynn W. Aas	Alpha-Sigma / University of North Dakota	Member of the North Dakota House of Representatives (1967–1971, 1987–1991)	
Oscar A. Ahlgren	Kappa / Beloit College	Member of the Indiana House of Representatives (1921–1931)	
John Anggelis	Gamma-Sigma / University of Kentucky	Kentucky State Senator (1956–1959)	
Shawn A. Babine	Lambda-Delta / University of Southern Maine	Member of the Maine House of Representatives (2018–2020)	
André Bauer	Rho-Omega / University of South Carolina	87th Lieutenant Governor of South Carolina (2003–2011)	
Bob Butterworth	Gamma-Theta / University of Florida	33rd Florida Attorney General (1987–2002)	
Pete Cenarrusa	Alpha-Delta / University of Idaho	Secretary of State of Idaho (1967–2003), member of the Idaho House of Representatives (1951–1967)	
John J. Conard Sr.	Alpha-Phi / University of Kansas	Speaker of the Kansas House of Representatives (1967–1968), member of the Kansas House of Representatives (1959–1968), Republican nominee for Lieutenant Governor of Kansas in 1968	
Charles D. Cook	Gamma-Zeta / Hartwick College	New York State Senator (1979–1998), member of the New York State Assembly (1973–1978)	
Tom Dempsey	Kappa-Nu / Rockhurst University	Missouri State Senator (2009–2015), President Pro Tempore of the Missouri Senate (2013–2015)	
Jimmy Fitzmorris	Theta-Mu / University of New Orleans	46th Lieutenant Governor of Louisiana (1972–1980)	
Charles Foti	Theta-Mu / University of New Orleans	Louisiana Attorney General (2004–2008)	
John Wesley Fribley	Alpha / Illinois Wesleyan University	Illinois State Senator (1934–1952)	
James Allen Graham	Beta-Beta / North Carolina State University	13th North Carolina Commissioner of Agriculture (1964–2000)	
Roscoe Greenwood	Epsilon / Iowa State University	Member of the Iowa House of Representatives (1957–1961)	
Jay Paul Gumm	Epsilon-Theta / Southeastern Oklahoma State University	Oklahoma State Senator (2002–2010)	
David Hartley	Alpha-Chi / University of Louisville	Member of the Ohio House of Representatives (1973–1998)	
David S. Hayes	Delta-Chi / Gannon University	Member of the Pennsylvania House of Representatives (1969–1980)	
William Horne	Pi-Lambda / University of Nevada, Las Vegas	Member of the Nevada Assembly (2003–2015)	
Rick Horner	Lambda-Psi Colony / East Carolina University	North Carolina State Senator (2017–2021)	
Donald Hunter	Gamma-Psi / Butler University	Justice of the Indiana Supreme Court (1967–1985)	
Walter Jenny	Omicron-Phi / University of Oklahoma	Secretary of the Oklahoma Democratic Party (2005–2009)	
Jim Kyle	Beta-Psi / Arkansas State University	Tennessee State Senator (1983–2014)	
J. Mike Lawter	Epsilon-Sigma / University of Central Oklahoma	Member of the Oklahoma House of Representatives (1976–1986)	
Charles E. Lee	Beta / Millikin University	Illinois State Senator (1929–1933), mayor of Decatur, Illinois (1936–1943)	
James E. Long	Beta-Beta / North Carolina State University	9th North Carolina Commissioner of Insurance (1985–2009)	
LaMonte Lundstrom	Phi / University of Nebraska–Lincoln	Member of the Nebraska House of Representatives (1933)	
Max T. Malone	Beta-Zeta / Louisiana Tech University	Louisiana State Senator (1996–2008)	
Dean McCully	Alpha / Illinois Wesleyan University	Member of the Illinois House of Representatives (1952–1968)	
Dave Mejias	Pi-Omega / University at Albany, SUNY	Member of the County Legislature of Nassau County, New York, Democratic candidate for the United States House of Representatives in 2006	
Ernest N. Mobley	Alpha-Beta / Ohio University	Member of the California State Assembly (1967–1976)	
Jean-Paul Morrell	Upsilon-Alpha / Spring Hill College	Louisiana State Senator (2009–2020), member of the Louisiana House of Representatives (2006–2008)	
Walter Myers Jr.	Gamma-Psi / Butler University	Justice of the Indiana Supreme Court (1963–1967)	
Bob Paduchik	Beta-Rho / University of Akron	Chair of the Ohio Republican Party (2021–2023), co-chairman of the Republican National Committee (2017–2019)	
Allen Paul	Gamma-Pi / Parsons College	Indiana State Senator (1986–2014)	
Ron Reagan	Xi-Lambda / University of Georgia	Member of the Florida House of Representatives (2002–2010)	
Roy Wilford Riegle	Gamma-Phi / Emporia State University	Kansas State Senator (1941–1943, 1953–1961), member of the Kansas House of Representatives (1933–1941), Grand Master of the Knights Templar (1973–1976)	
Barrett Rogers	Iota / Eureka College	Member of the Illinois House of Representatives (1948–1960)	
Harold Rudisill	Psi / Gettysburg College	Member of the Pennsylvania House of Representatives (1955–1968)	
C. Thomas Schettino	Alpha-Eta / Rutgers University	Associate Justice of the Supreme Court of New Jersey (1959–1972)	
Thomas W. Shallington	Beta-Beta / North Carolina State University	Member of the North Carolina House of Representatives (1947)	
Tyler Sirois	Lambda-Iota / Florida State University	Member of the Florida House of Representatives (2019–present)	
Eric Skrmetta	Beta-Phi / Louisiana State University	Louisiana Public Service Commissioner (2009–present)	
David Burnell Smith	Theta-Omega / University of Charleston	Member of the Arizona House of Representatives (2005–2006, 2011–2013)	
Clifford J. Vogelsang	Alpha / Illinois Wesleyan University	Illinois State Senator (1933)	
Keith Wagner	Omicron-Eta / West Virginia University Institute of Technology	West Virginia State Senator (1989–1996)	
David Wallace	Rho / West Virginia University	West Virginia State Senator (1971–1974)	
Marcus Wiedower	Xi-Lambda / University of Georgia	Member of the Georgia House of Representatives (2019–present)	
Donald O. Wright	Theta / University of Minnesota	35th Lieutenant Governor of Minnesota (1954–1955), Minnesota State Senator (1935–1954, 1955–1962, 1963–1970), member of the Minnesota House of Representatives (1927–1934)	

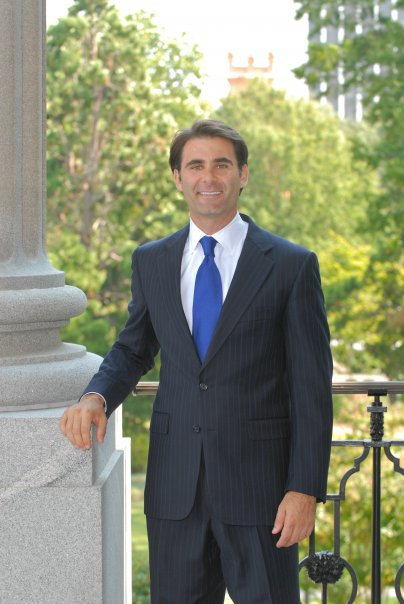
André Bauer

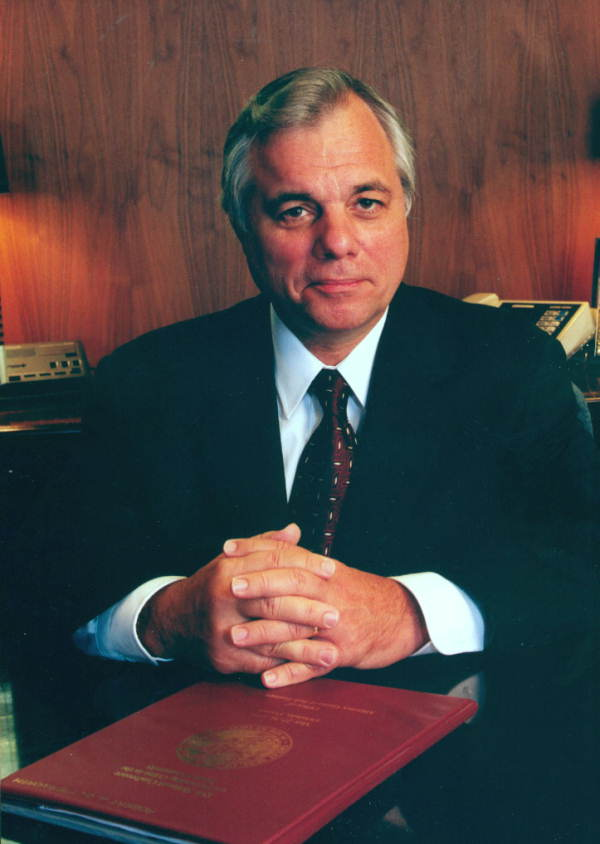
Bob Butterworth

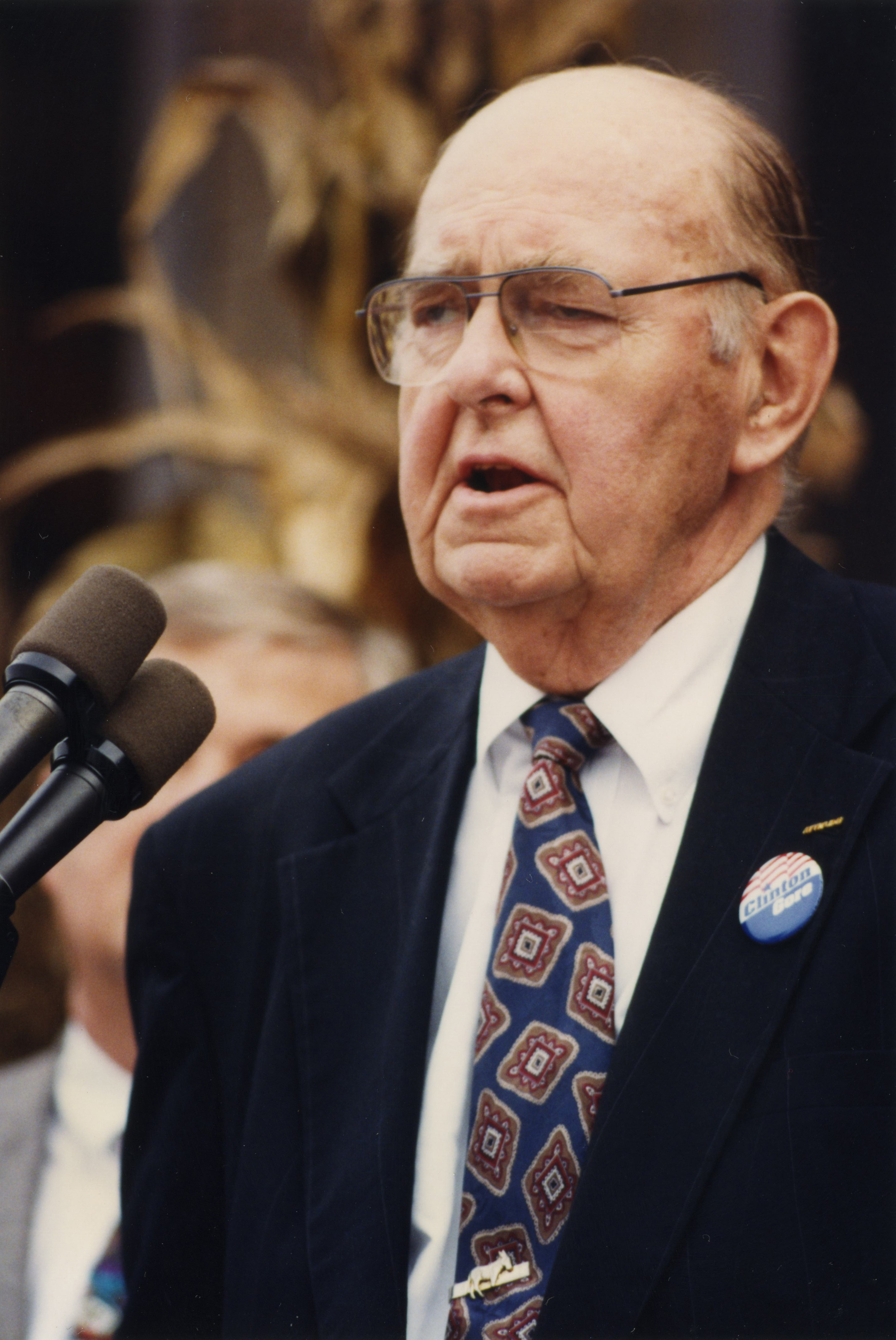
James Allen Graham

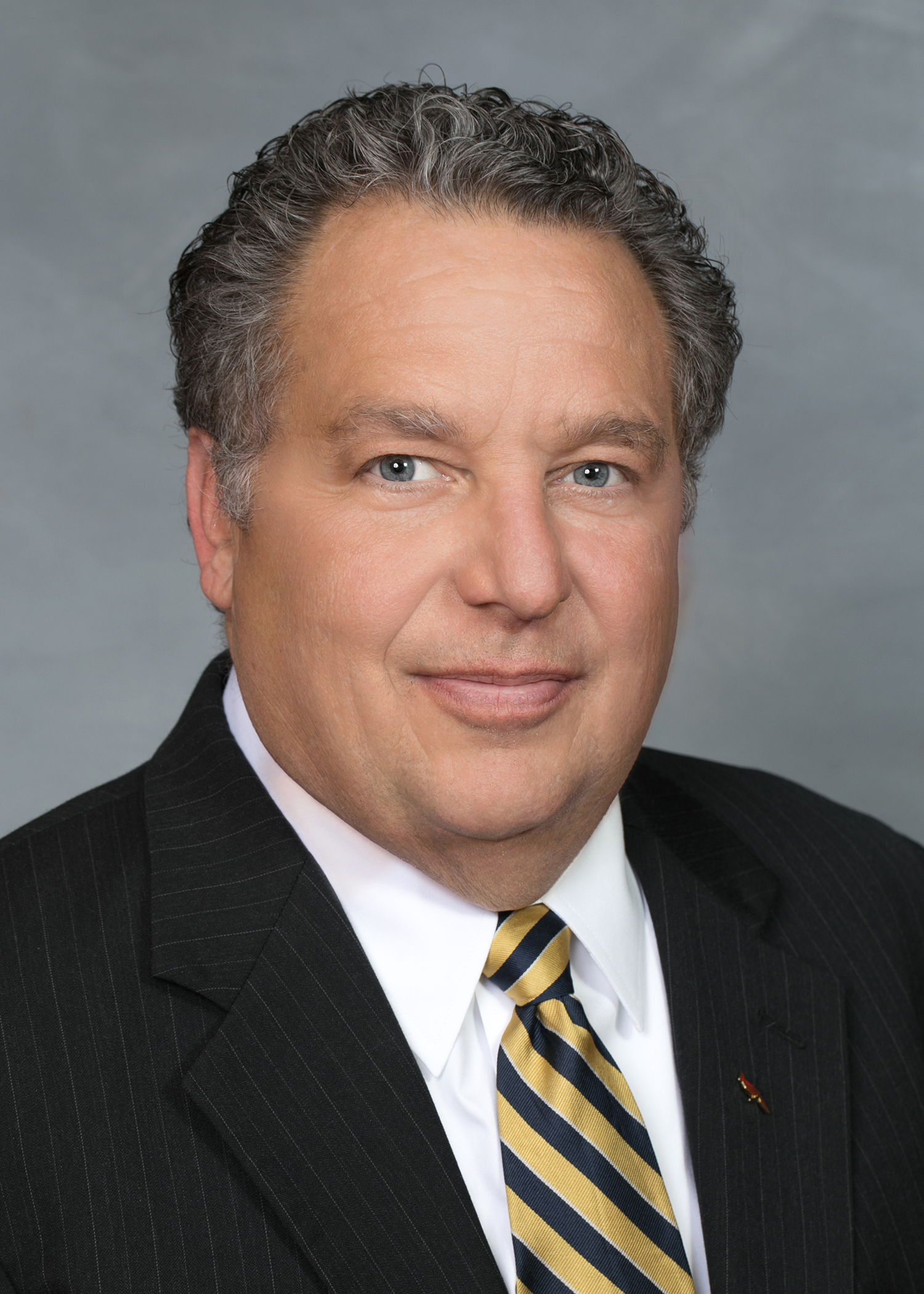
Rick Horner

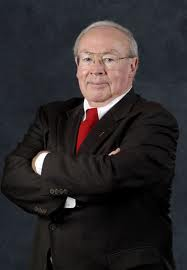
James E. Long

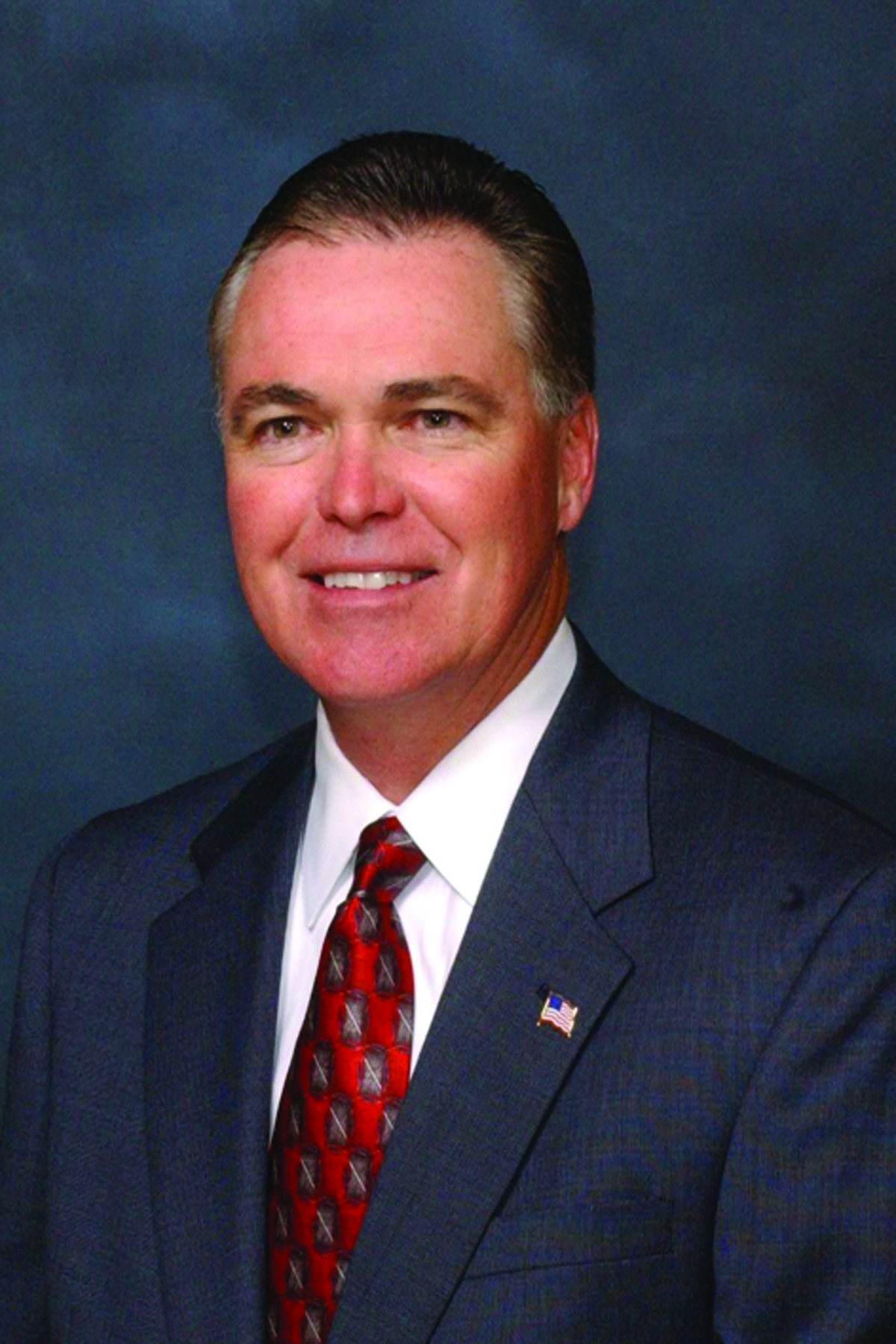
Ron Reagan

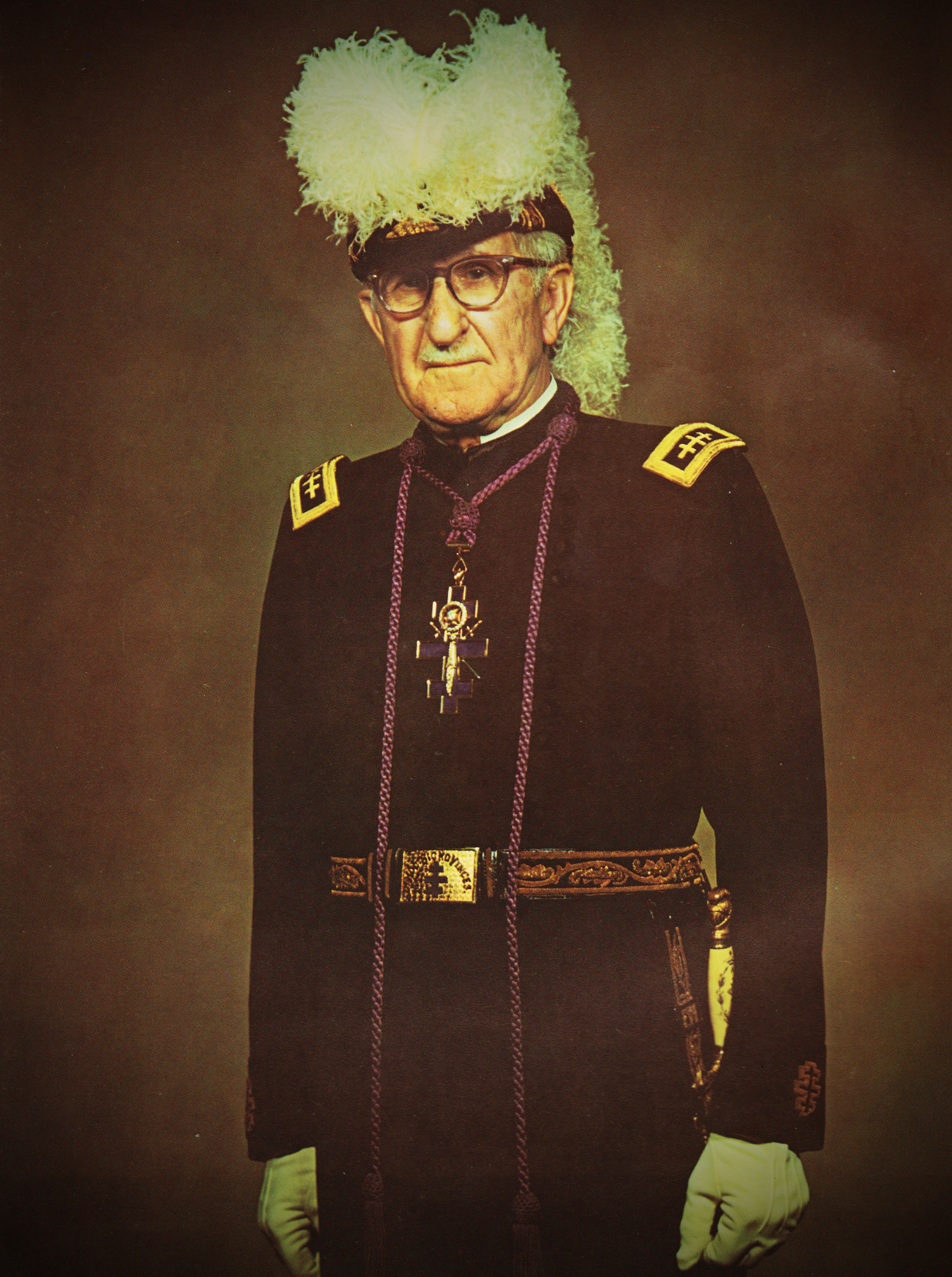
Roy Wilford Riegle

=== Mayors ===
Name	Original chapter	Notability	Ref.
Don Henderson	Gamma-Gamma / University of Texas at El Paso	39th Mayor of El Paso, Texas (1975–1977)	
William H. Hudnut III	Gamma-Psi / Butler University	45th Mayor of Indianapolis (1976–1992) which is the city's longest-serving mayor, U.S. Representative from Indiana (1973–1975)	
Sly James	Kappa-Nu / Rockhurst University	54th Mayor of Kansas City, Missouri (2011–2019)	
Don Jones	Beta-Zeta / Louisiana Tech University	13th Mayor of Bossier City, Louisiana (1984–1989), National President of the Junior Chamber International (1982–1983)	
Watkins Overton	Mu / Carroll University	40th and 47th Mayor of Memphis, Tennessee (1928–1939, 1949–1953) which is the city's longest-serving mayor, Tennessee State Senator (1927)	
Joe Reardon	Kappa-Nu / Rockhurst University	28th Mayor of Kansas City, Kansas (2005–2013)	
Victor H. Schiro	Theta-Mu / University of New Orleans	55th Mayor of New Orleans (1961–1970)	
Terry Schrunk	Zeta-Kappa / Portland State University	40th Mayor of Portland, Oregon (1957–1973)	

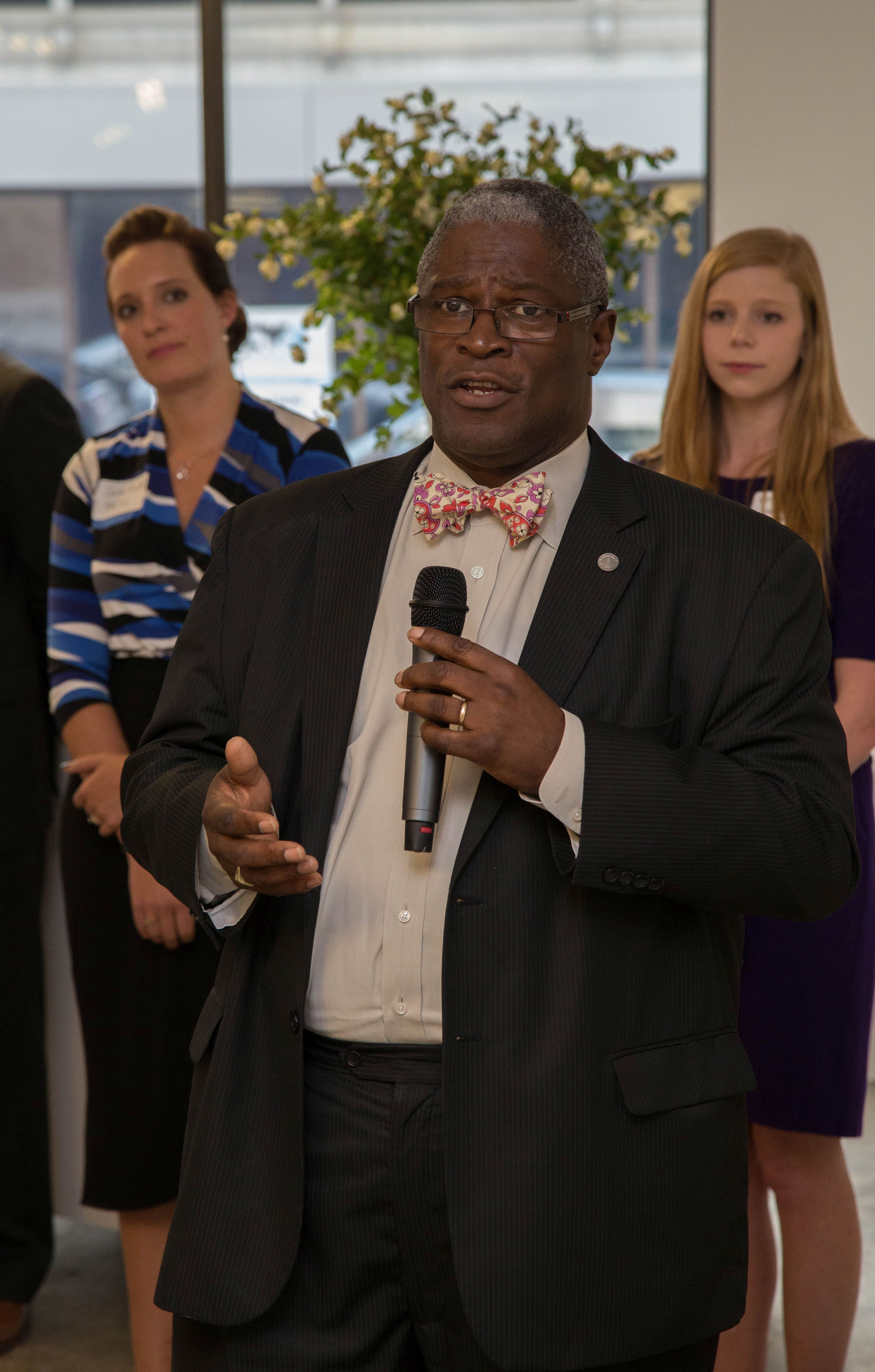
Sly James

=== Native American government ===
Name	Original chapter	Notability	Ref.
Gregory E. Pyle	Epsilon-Theta / Southeastern Oklahoma State University	Chief of the Choctaw Nation of Oklahoma (1997–2014)	

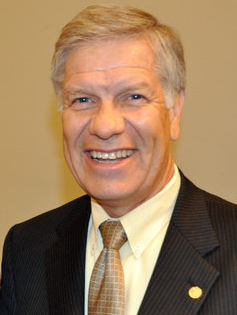
Chief Gregory E. Pyle

== Education, art, and religion ==
Name	Original chapter	Notability	Ref.
Stuart Anderson	Omega / Albion College	President of Pacific School of Religion (1950–1971)	
Joseph Blumel	Zeta-Kappa / Portland State University	President of Portland State University (1974–1986)	
Raymond G. Bressler Sr.	Pi / Pennsylvania State University	President of the University of Rhode Island (1931–1940)	
James A. Butcher	Epsilon-Xi / Shepherd University	President of Shepherd University (1968–1988)	
John Carter	Beta-Pi / Georgia Tech	President of the Georgia Tech Foundation (1998–2013)	
Fred Carter	Xi-Iota / University of Central Florida	President of Francis Marion University (1999–present)	
Scott Cowen	Delta-Gamma / University of Connecticut	President of Tulane University (1998–2014)	
James Credle	Theta-Zeta / Rutgers University–Newark	Assistant dean of student affairs at Rutgers University–Newark (1976–2005), known for activism with veterans and LGBT rights	
John E. Cribbet	Alpha / Illinois Wesleyan University	Chancellor of the University of Illinois (1979–1984)	
John E. Deloney	Beta-Lambda / Auburn University	President of University of West Alabama (1963–1972)	
Eugene B. Elliott	Omega / Albion College	President of Eastern Michigan University (1948–1965)	
Roger J. Fritz	Alpha-Epsilon / Monmouth College	President of Willamette University (1969–1972)	
Grady Gammage	Beta-Xi / Arizona State University	President of Northern Arizona University (1926–1933) and Arizona State University (1933–1959), where Gammage Memorial Auditorium is named in his honor	
Gregory L. Geoffroy	Alpha-Chi / University of Louisville	President of Iowa State University (2001–2012)	
William Howarth	Gamma Colony / University of Illinois	Professor emeritus at Princeton University	
W. Gilbert James	Alpha / Illinois Wesleyan University	Acting president of University of Nebraska Omaha (1926–1927, 1928, 1930–1931), president of Highland University (1914–1919)	
Arnold R. Kilpatrick	Epsilon-Mu / University of Louisiana at Monroe	President of Northwestern State University (1966–1978)	
Harold Lasswell	Eta / University of Chicago	Professor of law at Yale University, President of the American Political Science Association (1955–1956)	
Chester F. Lay	Eta / University of Chicago	President of Southern Illinois University Carbondale (1945–1948)	
Thomas S. Leary	Epsilon-Psi / McNeese State University	President of McNeese State University (1969–1980)	
Bernard Lomas	Omega / Albion College	President of Albion College (1970–1983)	
Carl McKinley	Delta / Knox College	Composer of classical music for orchestra, faculty member at the New England Conservatory of Music (1929–1963)	
Harry W. McPherson	Alpha / Illinois Wesleyan University	President of Illinois Wesleyan University (1932–1937)	
Conger Metcalf	Zeta / Coe College	American Regionalist painter, art professor at Boston University (1956–1972)	
Edward D. Miller	Alpha-Mu / Ohio Wesleyan University	Dean of the Medical School at Johns Hopkins University and CEO of Johns Hopkins Medicine (1997–2012)	
William Muse	Epsilon-Upsilon / Northwestern State University	President of the University of Akron (1984–1992), President of Auburn University (1992–2001), Chancellor of East Carolina University (2001–2003), and Grand Prytanis (Grand President) of Tau Kappa Epsilon (1977–1979)	
B. D. Owens	Delta-Nu / Northwest Missouri State University	President of Northwest Missouri State University (1977–1984)	
Gary John Previts	Upsilon-Alpha / Spring Hill College	Professor of accounting at the Weatherhead School of Management (1979–2023), inducted into the Accounting Hall of Fame in 2011	
Raymond B. Purdum	Alpha-Psi / Davis & Elkins College	President of Davis & Elkins College (1943–1954)	
Earl Roadman	Delta-Sigma / Morningside University	President of Morningside College (1936–1956)	
Nelson V. Russell	Zeta / Coe College	President of Carroll University (1946–1951)	
Bruce Saville	Omicron / Ohio State University	Sculptor known for monuments and memorials, faculty member at Ohio State University (1921–1925) and the Columbus College of Art and Design (1921–1925)	
John L. Seaton	Omega / Albion College	President of Albion College (1924–1945), President of the Association of American Colleges and Universities (1938–1939)	
Thaddeus Seymour	Nu / University of California, Berkeley	President of Wabash College (1969–1978) and Rollins College (1978–1990)	
Joseph J. Sisco	Delta / Knox College	President of American University (1976–1980)	
Hoke L. Smith	Delta / Knox College	President of Towson University (1979–2001)	
Donald Stanton	Theta-Omicron / Adrian College	President of Adrian College (1978–1988), President of Oglethorpe University (1988–1999)	
J. Richard Stoltz	Delta-Omicron Colony / Central Michigan University	President of Lincoln College (1972–1977)	
Donald R. Theophilus	Epsilon / Iowa State University	President of University of Idaho (1954–1965)	
Jared R. Tice	Iota-Xi / Concord University	President of Capital University (2025–present)	
Dean E. Wolfe	Delta-Xi / Miami University	Rector of the historic St. Bartholomew's Church in New York City (2017–present), Bishop of Kansas (2004–2017)	
Gordon Wright	Alpha-Theta / Whitman College	Historian known for his expertise on modern French history, executive head of the history department at Stanford University (1959–1965)	
Gabriel Zeis	Delta-Phi / Saint Francis University	President of Saint Francis University (2004–2014), Catholic Chaplain at Princeton University (2016–2019)	

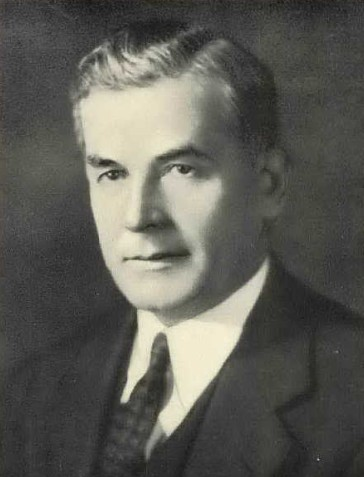
Raymond G. Bressler Sr.

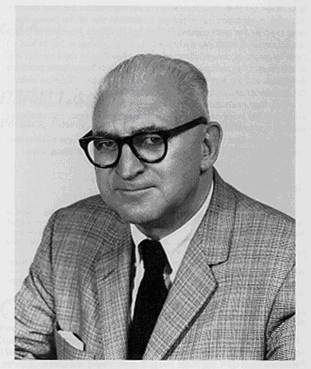
Harold D. Lasswell

== Science and medicine ==
Name	Original chapter	Notability	Ref.
Emik Avakian	Iota / Eureka College	Inventor and owner of numerous patents geared towards the improvement of disabled people's lives, honored by President John F. Kennedy in 1961 for the "Most Outstanding Contribution to Employment of the Handicapped"	
David P. Campbell	Epsilon / Iowa State University	Psychologist who co-authored the Strong Interest Inventory	
Paul Roberts Cannon	Beta / Millikin University	Pathologist who was a pioneer in the study of nutritional effects on immune response, chair of the Department of Pathology at the University of Chicago (1940–1957)	
Kenneth Edward Caster	Scorpion / Cornell University	Geologist and paleontologist best known for his research on fossil echinoderms and arthropods and the use of the facies concept in stratigraphy	
William Alfred Fowler	Omicron / Ohio State University	Nuclear physicist, astrophysicist, and recipient of the 1983 Nobel Prize in Physics for his work studying nuclear reactions within stars	
H. Hugh Fudenberg	Alpha-Omega / University of California, Los Angeles	Immunologist who studied the purported link between the MMR vaccine and autism	
Paul Greengard	Alpha-Iota / Hamilton College	Neuroscientist best known for his work on the molecular and cellular function of neurons, recipient of the 2000 Nobel Prize in Physiology or Medicine	
Julian W. Hill	Xi / Washington University in St. Louis	DuPont chemist who helped develop nylon	
Donald J. Hughes	Eta / University of Chicago	Senior physicist at the Brookhaven National Laboratory, one of the signers of the Franck Report recommending that the United States not use the atomic bomb as a weapon to prompt the surrender of Japan in World War II	
Dominic A. Infante	Zeta-Lambda / Bowling Green State University	Professor of communication studies at Kent State University (1976–1995), ranked in 1992 as the top producer of research articles in organizational communication in the country, known for research in communication theory and verbal aggressiveness	
Clifford J. MacGregor	Alpha-Pi / George Washington University	Arctic explorer best known for commanding the MacGregor Arctic Expedition and proving that plotting Arctic weather would make possible more precise, longer-range Northern Hemispheric weather forecasting	
Carl Shipp Marvel	Alpha / Illinois Wesleyan University	Professor of chemistry at the University of Illinois Urbana-Champaign (1920–1961) and the University of Arizona (1961–1988) whose research was critical for the successful commercial production of synthetic rubber during World War II, recipient of the 1986 National Medal of Science	
Daniel McFadden	Theta / University of Minnesota	Recipient of the 2000 Nobel Memorial Prize in Economic Sciences for his work developing the model of discrete choice, presidential professor of Health Economics at the University of Southern California and graduate professor at University of California, Berkeley	
E. Lee Spence	Gamma-Delta / University of Miami	Pioneer underwater archaeologist, discoverer of the Confederate submarine Hunley	

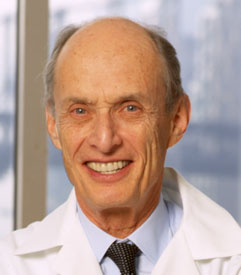
Paul Greengard

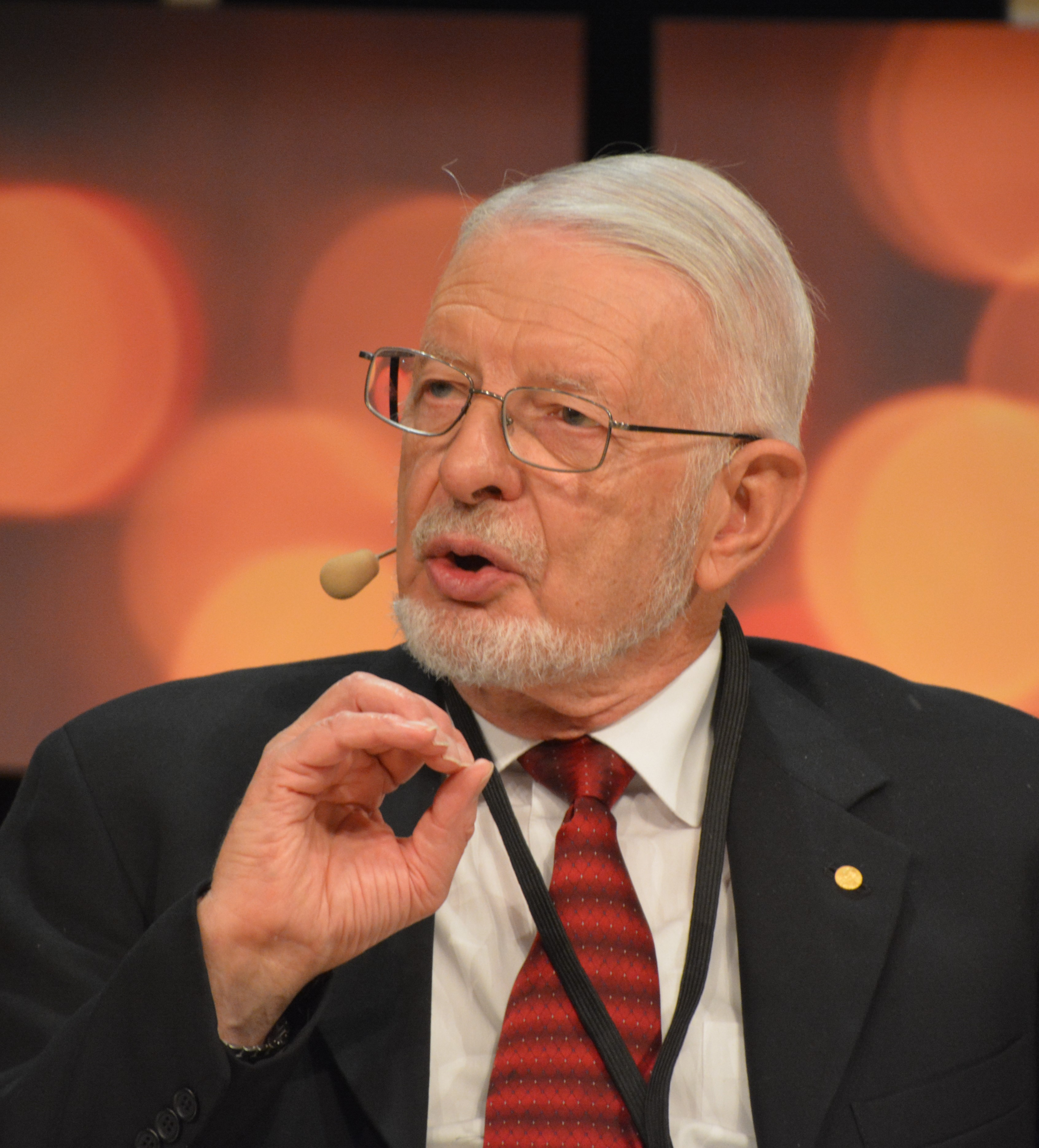
Daniel McFadden

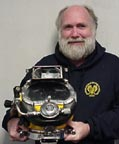
E. Lee Spence

=== NASA ===
Name	Original chapter	Notability	Ref.
Andrew M. Allen	Kappa-Upsilon / Villanova University	Lieutenant colonel, U.S. Marine Corps, NASA astronaut who flew three Space Shuttle missions (STS-46, STS-62, and STS-75)	
Gerald P. Carr	Beta-Sigma / University of Southern California	Colonel, U.S. Marine Corps, NASA astronaut, Commander of Skylab 4 (1973–1974)	
Steven W. Squyres	Scorpion / Cornell University	Principal Investigator of the Mars Exploration Rover mission and chair of the NASA Advisory Council (2011–2016)	

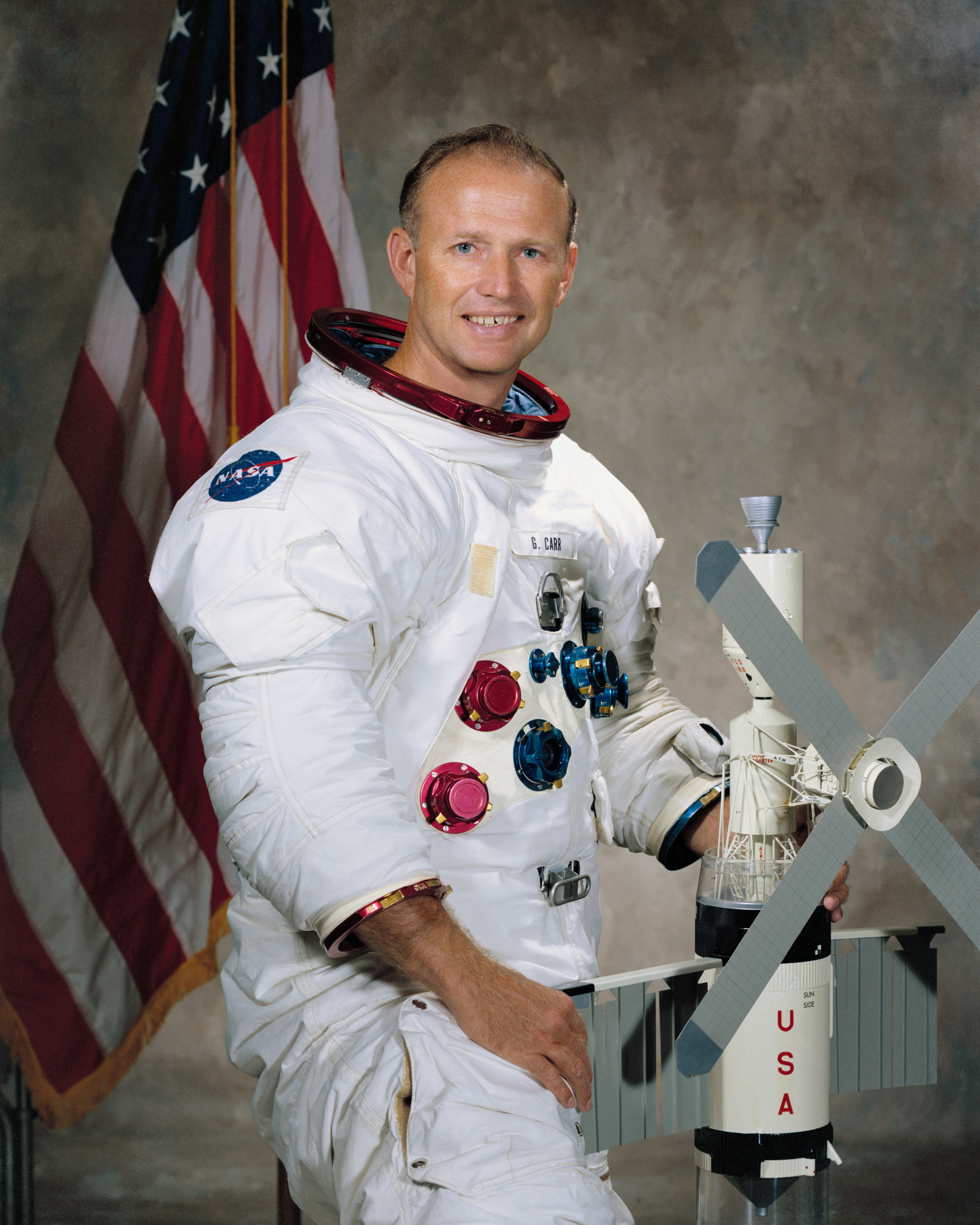
Gerald P. Carr

== Sports ==
=== American football ===
Name	Original chapter	Notability	Ref.
Danny Abramowicz	Mu-Zeta / Nicholls State University	NFL wide receiver for the New Orleans Saints (1967–1973) and San Francisco 49ers (1973–1974)	
Ron Acks	Gamma / University of Illinois	NFL linebacker for the Atlanta Falcons (1968–1971), New England Patriots (1972–1973), and Green Bay Packers (1974–1976)	
Alex Agase	Gamma / University of Illinois	NFL guard and linebacker for the Cleveland Browns (1948–1951) and Baltimore Colts (1953), 3× All-American (1942–1943, 1946), head football coach for Northwestern University (1964–1972) and Purdue University (1973–1976)	
Larry Baker	Zeta-Lambda / Bowling Green State University	NFL offensive tackle for the New York Titans (1960)	
Pete Barbolak	Alpha-Zeta / Purdue University	NFL offensive tackle for the Pittsburgh Steelers (1949)	
Mike Barry	Beta-Chi / Southern Illinois University Carbondale	NFL offensive line coach for the Detroit Lions (2006–2008)	
John Beasley	Nu / University of California, Berkeley	NFL tight end for the Minnesota Vikings (1967–1973) and the New Orleans Saints (1973–1974)	
Tom Beer	Epsilon-Phi / University of Detroit	AFL tight end for the Denver Broncos (1967–1969), NFL football player for the Boston Patriots (1970) and New England Patriots (1971–1972)	
Libero Bertagnolli	Xi / Washington University in St. Louis	NFL guard for the Chicago Cardinals (1942, 1945) and head football coach for Illinois Wesleyan University (1951–1953)	
Blake Bortles	Xi-Iota / University of Central Florida	NFL quarterback for the Jacksonville Jaguars (2014–2018)	
Terry Bradshaw	Beta-Zeta / Louisiana Tech University	NFL quarterback for the Pittsburgh Steelers (1970–1983), 4× Super Bowl champion (IX, X, XIII, XIV), 2× Super Bowl MVP (XIII, XIV), Fox Broadcasting Company football analyst	
John W. Breen	Mu / Carroll University	NFL general manager for the Houston Oilers (1971–1973), head football coach for Carroll University (1938–1948) and Lake Forest College (1949–1951)	
Jim Cheyunski	Iota-Zeta / Syracuse University	NFL linebacker for the Boston/New England Patriots (1968–1972), the Buffalo Bills (1973–1974), and the Baltimore Colts (1975–1976)	
Randy Clark	Delta-Eta / Northern Illinois University	NFL tackle for the St. Louis Cardinals (1980–1986) and the Atlanta Falcons (1987)	
Ben Davis	Iota-Phi / Defiance College	NFL cornerback for the Cleveland Browns (1967–1973) and the Detroit Lions (1974–1976)	
Bob Dees	Beta-Omega / Missouri State University	NFL defensive tackle for the Green Bay Packers (1952)	
Fred Dryer	Gamma-Lambda / San Diego State University	NFL defensive end for the New York Giants (1969–1971) and the Los Angeles Rams (1972–1981), actor best known for playing Sgt. Rick Hunter in the television series Hunter (1984–1991)	
Stan Fanning	Alpha-Delta / University of Idaho	NFL tackle, defensive end, and defensive tackle for the Chicago Bears (1960–1962), Los Angeles Rams (1963), Denver Broncos (1964), and Houston Oilers (1964)	
Brett Faryniarz	Gamma-Lambda / San Diego State University	NFL linebacker for the Los Angeles Rams (1988–1991), the San Francisco 49ers (1993), the Houston Oilers (1994), and the Carolina Panthers (1995)	
Perry Fewell	Delta-Iota / Lenoir-Rhyne University	NFL defensive backs coach for the Washington Redskins (2015–2016) and the Jacksonville Jaguars (2017–2018)	
Joe Fields	Theta-Lambda / Widener University	NFL guard for the New York Jets (1975–1987) and the New York Giants (1988), 2× Pro Bowl selection (1981–1982), 3× All-Pro selection (1981–1982, 1985)	
Charlie Gainor	Alpha-Sigma / University of North Dakota	NFL defensive end for the Chicago Cardinals (1939)	
Kevin Gilbride	Tau-Eta / Southern Connecticut State University	NFL offensive coordinator for the New York Giants (2007–2013), 2× Super Bowl champion (XLII, XLVI)	
Jim Grabowski	Gamma Colony / University of Illinois	NFL running back for the Green Bay Packers (1966–1970) and the Chicago Bears (1971)	
George Halas	Gamma / University of Illinois	Founder of the NFL, owner and coach of the Chicago Bears	
Graham Harrell	Sigma-Xi / St. Norbert College	NFL quarterback for the Green Bay Packers (2010–2012), Super Bowl XLV champion	
Jim Hart	Beta-Chi / Southern Illinois University Carbondale	NFL quarterback for the St. Louis Cardinals (1966–1983) and the Washington Redskins (1984), 4× Pro Bowl selection (1974–1977)	
Bill Hempel	Mu / Carroll University	NFL tackle for the Chicago Bears (1942)	
Frank Hertz	Mu / Carroll University	NFL end for the Milwaukee Badgers (1926)	
Rich Johnson	Gamma / University of Illinois	NFL running back for the Houston Oilers (1969)	
Tony Kaska	Alpha / Illinois Wesleyan University	NFL fullback for the Detroit Lions (1935) and the Brooklyn Dodgers (1936–1938)	
Chris Keating	Beta-Upsilon / University of Maine	NFL linebacker for the Buffalo Bills (1979–1984) and the Washington Redskins (1985)	
Mark Kellar	Delta-Eta / Northern Illinois University	NFL running back for the Minnesota Vikings (1976–1978)	
Keith Krepfle	Epsilon / Iowa State University	NFL tight end for the Philadelphia Eagles (1975–1981) and the Atlanta Falcons (1982), first Eagle to ever catch a touchdown in the Super Bowl (Super Bowl XV)	
Stan Kuick	Kappa / Beloit College	NFL guard for the Milwaukee Badgers (1926)	
Jake Kupp	Mu-Zeta / Nicholls State University	NFL guard for the Dallas Cowboys (1964–1965), the Washington Redskins (1966), and the New Orleans Saints (1967–1975), inducted into the New Orleans Saints Hall of Fame in 1991	
Wally Lemm	Mu / Carroll University	NFL head coach for the Houston Oilers (1961, 1966–1970) and the St. Louis Cardinals (1962–1965)	
Marv Levy	Zeta / Coe College	NFL head coach for the Kansas City Chiefs (1978–1982) and the Buffalo Bills (1986–1997)	
Jack Mackenroth	Alpha-Sigma / University of North Dakota	NFL center for the Detroit Lions (1938)	
Al Maeder	Theta / University of Minnesota	NFL tackle for the Minneapolis Red Jackets (1926–1929)	
Warren McVea	Kappa-Nu / Rockhurst University	NFL running back for the Cincinnati Bengals (1968–1969) and the Kansas City Chiefs (1969–1973)	
Jim Mertens	Theta-Delta / Fairmont State University	AFL tight end for the Miami Dolphins (1969), selected by the Cincinnati Reds in the 1969 Major League Baseball draft	
Derland Moore	Mu-Zeta / Nicholls State University	NFL defensive tackle/nose tackle for the New Orleans Saints (1973–1985) and the New York Jets (1986)	
John Neidert	Alpha-Chi / University of Louisville	NFL linebacker for the Cincinnati Bengals (1968), the New York Jets (1968–1969), and the Chicago Bears (1970)	
Rick Norton	Gamma-Sigma / University of Kentucky	NFL quarterback for the Miami Dolphins (1966–1969)	
Gerry Philbin	Epsilon-Chi / University at Buffalo	NFL defensive end for the New York Jets (1964–1972) and the Philadelphia Eagles (1973), Super Bowl III champion	
Jim Prestel	Alpha-Delta / University of Idaho	NFL defensive tackle for the Cleveland Browns (1960), the Minnesota Vikings (1961–1965), the New York Giants (1966), and the Washington Redskins (1967)	
Aaron Rodgers	Sigma-Xi / St. Norbert College	NFL quarterback for the Green Bay Packers (2005–2022), New York Jets (2023–2024), and Pittsburgh Steelers (2025–present), MVP of Super Bowl XLV, 10× Pro Bowl selection (2009, 2011, 2012, 2014–2016, 2018–2021), 4× first-team All-Pro (2011, 2014, 2020, 2021)	
John Schneller	Lambda / University of Wisconsin–Madison	NFL end for the Portsmouth Spartans/Detroit Lions (1930–1933)	
Herb Siegert	Alpha / Illinois Wesleyan University	NFL guard and linebacker for the Washington Redskins (1949–1951)	
Phil Simms	Mu-Sigma / Morehead State University	NFL quarterback for the New York Giants (1979–1993), 2× Super Bowl champion (XXI, XXV), TV commentator, and CBS football analyst	
Cameron Smith	Beta-Sigma / University of Southern California	NFL linebacker for the Minnesota Vikings (2019–2020)	
Ed Sparr	Mu / Carroll University	NFL tackle for the Racine Tornadoes (1926)	
Festus Tierney	Theta / University of Minnesota	NFL guard for the Minneapolis Marines (1923–1924) and the Milwaukee Badgers (1925)	
Hub Ulrich	Alpha-Phi / University of Kansas	AAFC end for the Miami Seahawks (1946)	
Danny Villanueva	Alpha-Omicron / New Mexico State University	NFL placekicker/punter for the Los Angeles Rams (1960–1964) and the Dallas Cowboys (1965–1967), co-founder of Univision	
Laurie Walquist	Gamma / University of Illinois	NFL quarterback for the Chicago Bears (1922, 1924–1931)	
Duke Washington	Alpha-Gamma / Washington State University	NFL running back for the Philadelphia Eagles (1955), known as the first black man to ever play in the University of Texas’ Memorial Stadium	
Erik Wilhelm	Tau / Oregon State University	NFL quarterback for the Cincinnati Bengals (1989–1991, 1993–1995, 1996–1997)	
Tom Wittum	Delta-Eta / Northern Illinois University	NFL punter for the San Francisco 49ers (1973–1977)	
Doug Wyatt	Mu-Zeta / Nicholls State University	NFL defensive back for the New Orleans Saints (1970–1972) and the Detroit Lions (1973–1974)	

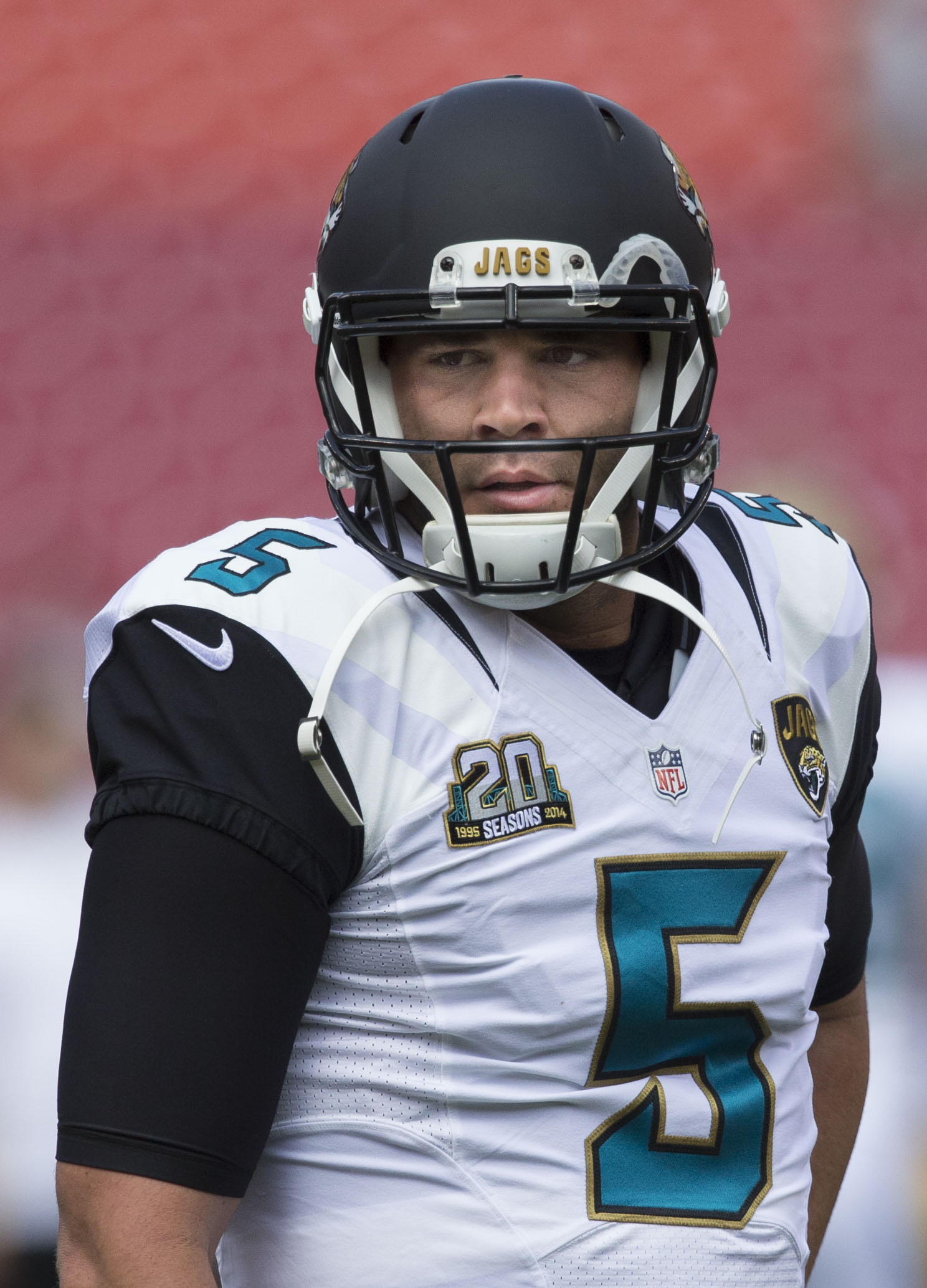
Blake Bortles

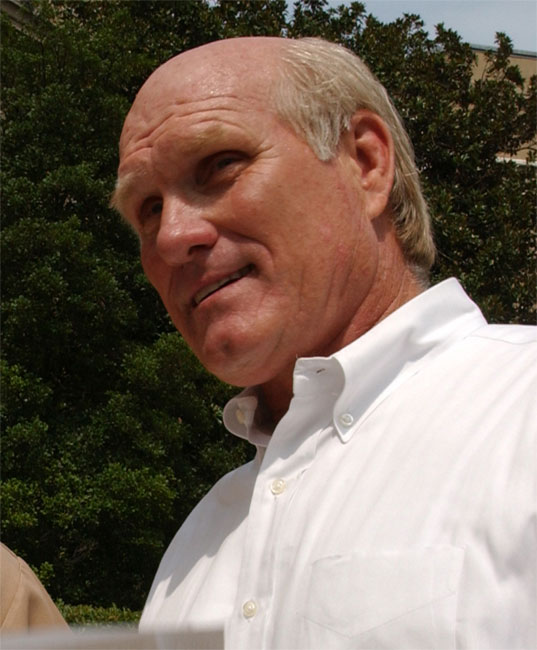
Terry Bradshaw

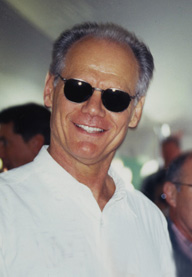
Fred Dryer

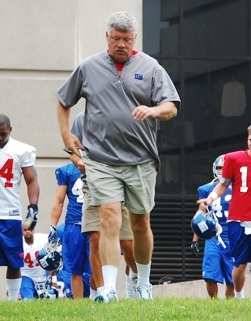
Kevin Gilbride

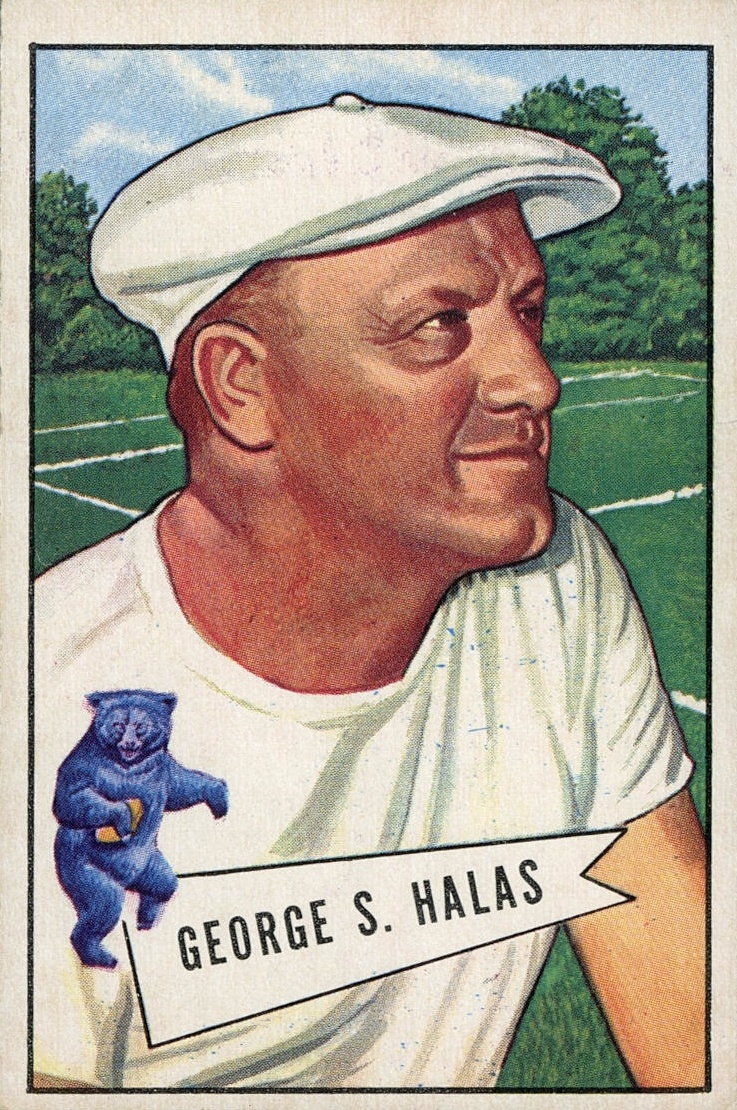
George Halas

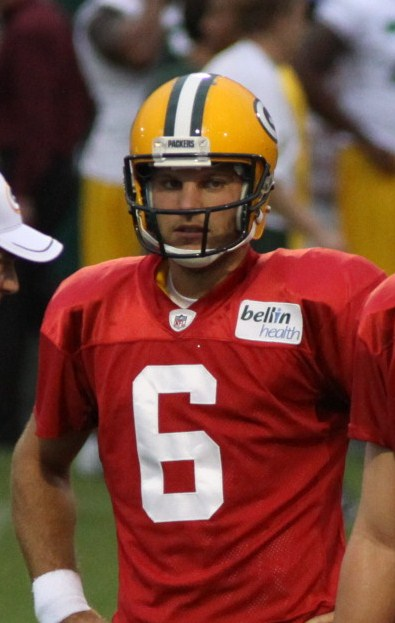
Graham Harrell

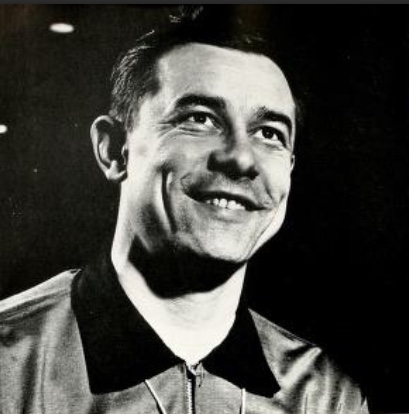
Wally Lemm

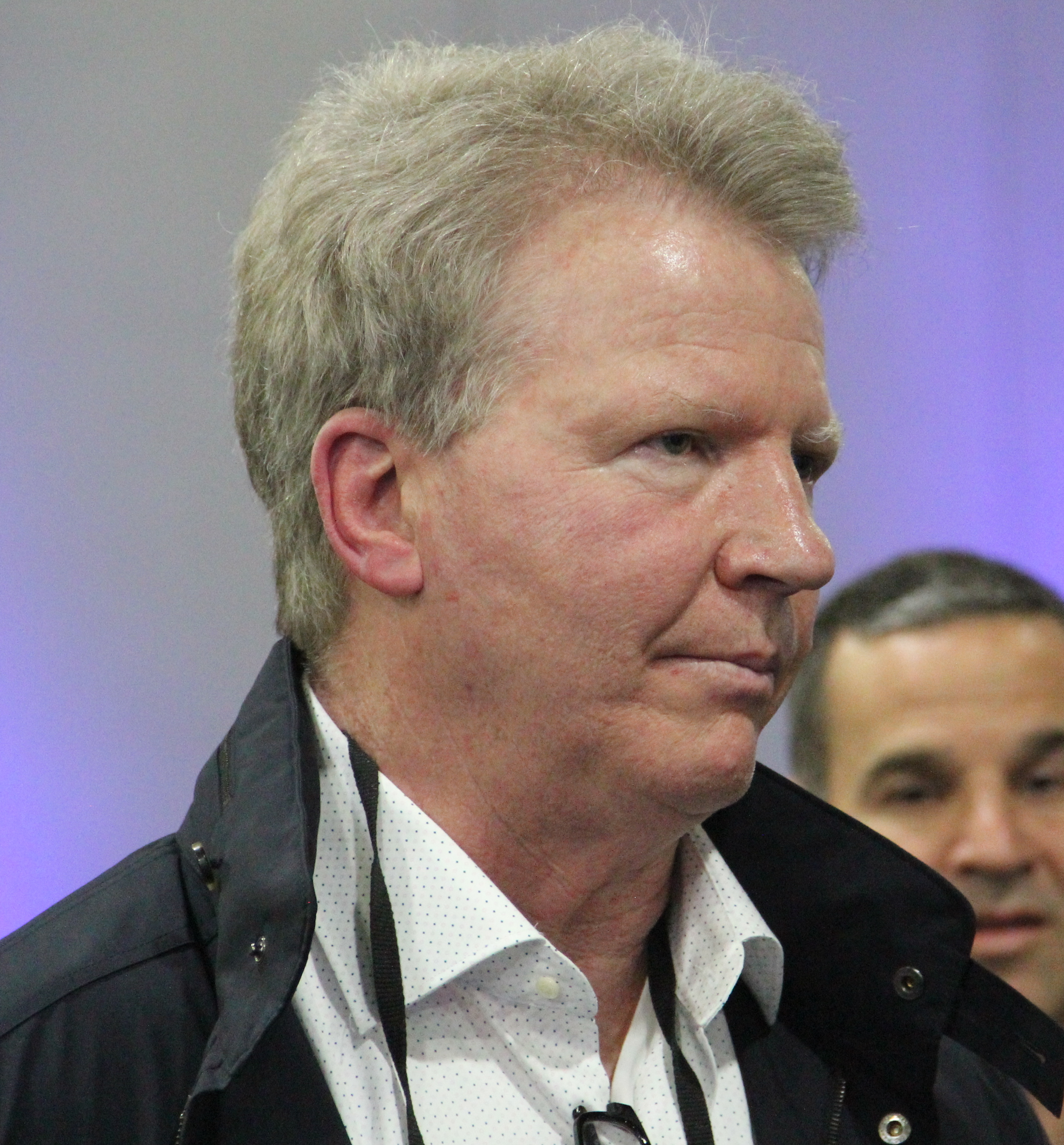
Phil Simms

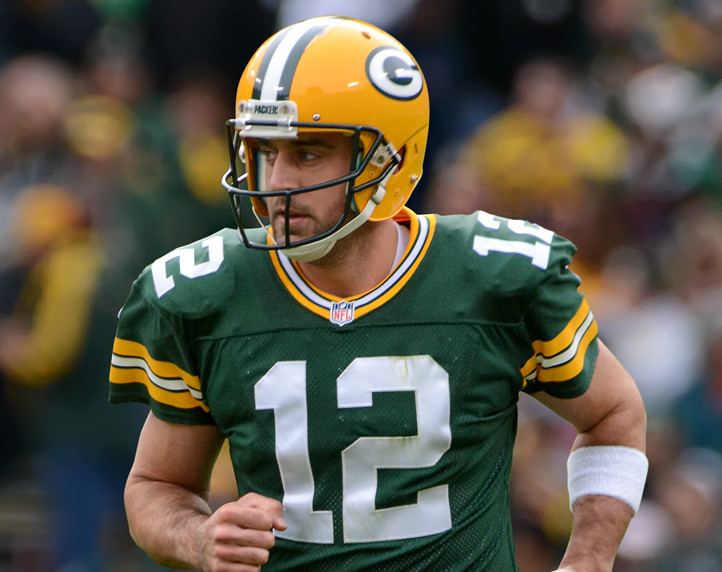
Aaron Rodgers

=== Baseball ===
Name	Original chapter	Notability	Ref.
Jim Crane	Delta-Lambda / University of Central Missouri	Owner of the Houston Astros (2011–present)	
Lee Dunham	Alpha / Illinois Wesleyan University	MLB first baseman for the Philadelphia Phillies (1926)	
Tom Gorman	Epsilon-Lambda / University of Missouri–Kansas City	MLB pitcher for the New York Yankees (1952–1954) and the Kansas City Athletics (1955–1959)	
Walter Halas	Gamma / University of Illinois	Minor League Baseball pitcher in the Illinois–Indiana–Iowa League, head baseball coach (1928–1941), football coach (1927–1941), and basketball coach (1927–1934) for Drexel University, brother of George Halas	
Ken Hamlin	Delta-Alpha / Western Michigan University	MLB shortstop and second baseman for the Pittsburgh Pirates (1957, 1959), Kansas City Athletics (1960), Los Angeles Angels (1961), and Washington Senators (1962, 1965–1966)	
Ron Herbel	Delta-Delta / University of Northern Colorado	MLB pitcher for the San Francisco Giants (1963–1969), San Diego Padres (1970), New York Mets (1970), and Atlanta Braves (1971)	
Steve Korcheck	Alpha-Pi / George Washington University	MLB catcher for the Washington Senators (1954–1955, 1958–1959)	
Duane Kuiper	Beta-Chi / Southern Illinois University Carbondale	MLB second baseman for the Cleveland Indians (1974–1981) and the San Francisco Giants (1982–1985) and an Emmy award-winning baseball commentator	
Craig Kusick	Theta-Phi / University of Wisconsin–La Crosse	MLB first baseman and designated hitter for the Minnesota Twins (1973–1979) and Toronto Blue Jays (1979)	
Bill Meehan	Alpha / Illinois Wesleyan University	MLB pitcher for the Philadelphia Athletics (1915)	
Willard Nixon	Beta-Lambda / Auburn University	MLB pitcher for the Boston Red Sox (1950–1958)	
Jim Northrup	Zeta-Delta / Alma College	MLB outfielder for the Detroit Tigers (1964–1974), Montreal Expos (1974), and Baltimore Orioles (1974–1975)	
Fritz Peterson	Delta-Eta / Northern Illinois University	MLB pitcher for the New York Yankees (1966–1974), Cleveland Indians (1974–1976), and Texas Rangers (1976)	
Dan Radison	Beta-Chi / Southern Illinois University Carbondale	MLB first base coach for the Washington Nationals (2010) and Houston Astros (2012), Minor League Baseball manager for the Albany-Colonie Yankees (1990–1992) and the Norwich Navigators (2000)	
Todd Ricketts	Epsilon-Kappa / Loyola University Chicago	Co-owner of the Chicago Cubs, member of the TD Ameritrade board of directors, Finance Chair of the Republican National Committee (2018–2021)	
Greg Riddoch	Delta-Delta / University of Northern Colorado	MLB manager for the San Diego Padres (1990–1992)	
Joe Sambito	Kappa-Theta / Adelphi University	All-Star MLB pitcher for the Houston Astros (1976–1982, 1984), New York Mets (1985), and Boston Red Sox (1986–1987)	
Richie Scheinblum	Theta-Kappa / LIU Post	All-Star MLB outfielder for the Cleveland Indians (1965, 1967–1969), the Washington Senators (1971), the Kansas City Royals (1972, 1974), the Cincinnati Reds (1973), the California Angels (1973–1974), and the St. Louis Cardinals (1974)	
Steve Simpson	Kappa-Omega / Washburn University	MLB relief pitcher for the San Diego Padres (1972)	
Bill Skowron	Alpha-Zeta / Purdue University	MLB first baseman for the New York Yankees (1954–1962), Los Angeles Dodgers (1963), Washington Senators (1964), Chicago White Sox (1964–1967), and California Angels (1967), eight-time All-Star and five-time World Series champion	
Preston Ward	Beta-Omega / Missouri State University	MLB first baseman for the Brooklyn Dodgers (1948), Chicago Cubs (1950 and 1953), Pittsburgh Pirates (1953–1956), Cleveland Indians (1956–1958), and Kansas City Athletics (1958–1959)	

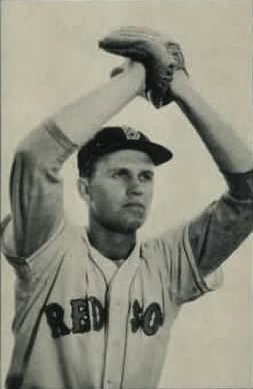
Willard Nixon

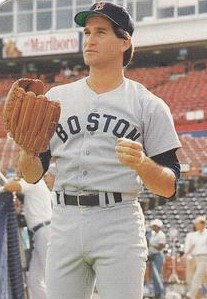
Joe Sambito

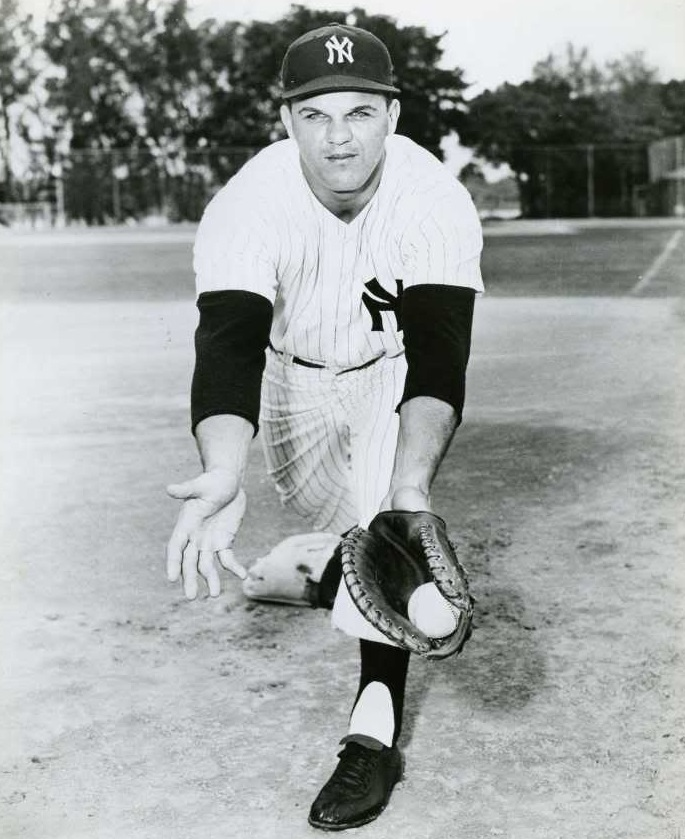
Bill Skowron

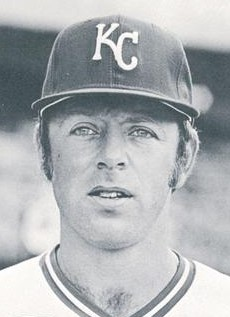
Richie Scheinblum

=== Basketball ===
Name	Original chapter	Notability	Ref.
Lou Carnesecca	Theta-Sigma / St. John's University	Head basketball coach for St. John's University (1965–1970, 1973–1992) and the American Basketball Association New York Nets (1970–1973), elected to the Naismith Memorial Basketball Hall of Fame in 1992	
Jim Harrick	Beta-Nu / Marshall University	Head basketball coach for Pepperdine University (1979–1988), UCLA (1988–1996), the University of Rhode Island (1997–1999), and the University of Georgia (1999–2003)	
Les Kuplic	Kappa / Beloit College	NBL forward for the Sheboygan Red Skins (1938–1940)	
Jack Madden	Epsilon-Zeta / Rider University	NBA referee (1964–1994) who officiated dozens of games in the NBA Finals	
Bevo Nordmann	Epsilon-Alpha / Saint Louis University	NBA center for the Cincinnati Royals (1961–1962), St. Louis Hawks (1962, 1963–1964), New York Knicks (1962–1963), and Boston Celtics (1964)	
Digger Phelps	Epsilon-Zeta / Rider University	ESPN College GameDay analyst (1993–2014) and former Notre Dame head basketball coach (1971–1991)	
Jim Snyder	Alpha-Beta / Ohio University	Head basketball coach for Ohio University (1949–1974)	
Maurice Stokes	Delta-Phi / Saint Francis University	NBA power forward/center for the Rochester/Cincinnati Royals (1955–1958) who is depicted in the 1973 film Maurie	

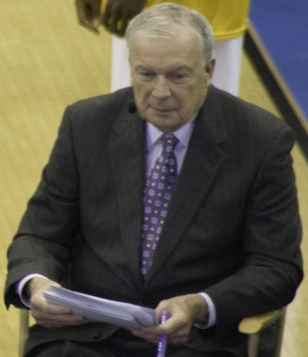
Digger Phelps

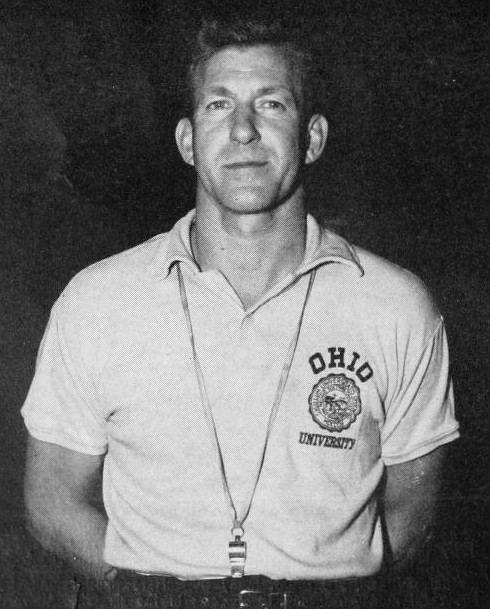
Jim Snyder

=== Canadian football ===
Name	Original chapter	Notability	Ref.
Glen Christian	Alpha-Delta / University of Idaho	CFL halfback for the Calgary Stampeders (1953–1955, 1957) and the BC Lions (1955–1956)	
Karl Douglas	Nu-Upsilon / Texas A&M University–Kingsville	CFL quarterback for the BC Lions (1973–1974) and the Calgary Stampeders (1974–1975)	
Ed Enos	Delta-Gamma / University of Connecticut	CFL tackle for the BC Lions (1957–1958)	
Steve Ferrughelli	Alpha-Eta / Rutgers University	CFL fullback for the Montreal Alouettes (1973–1976) and the Edmonton Eskimos (1976)	
Martin Gainor	Alpha-Sigma / University of North Dakota	CFL tackle for the Winnipeg Blue Bombers (1937–1939)	
Peter Muller	Zeta-Theta / Western Illinois University	CFL tight end for the Toronto Argonauts (1973–1981)	

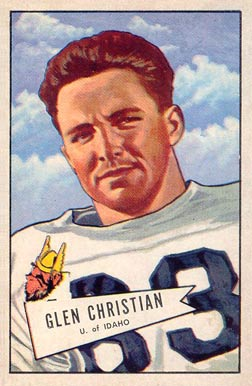
Glen Christian

=== College football ===
Name	Original chapter	Notability	Ref.
Harold V. Almquist	Theta / University of Minnesota	Quarterback for the University of Minnesota (1925–1927), head football coach (1928–1940), basketball coach (1931–1932, 1934–1941), and baseball coach (1929–1942) for Augustana College	
Jeff Bower	Pi-Psi / University of Southern Mississippi	Quarterback for the University of Georgia (1971) and University of Southern Mississippi (1972–1975), head football coach for the University of Southern Mississippi (1990–2007), named "Coach of the Decade" by Conference USA in 2004	
Jim Cole	Zeta-Delta / Alma College	Quarterback for Alma College (1970–1972), head football coach for Alma College (1991–2012)	
Harry Gamage	Gamma / University of Illinois	Center for Western Illinois University (1919) and the University of Illinois (1921), head football coach for the University of Kentucky (1927–1933) and University of South Dakota (1934–1941, 1946–1955)	
Ward Haylett	Alpha-Lambda / Kansas State University	Head football coach for Doane University (1924–1927) and Kansas State University (1942–1944), head basketball coach for Doane University (1918–1919, 1924–1928), inducted in the National Track and Field Hall of Fame in 1979	
Francis J. McCormick	Mu / Carroll University	Head football coach for St. Norbert College (1934–1942) and Carroll University (1949–1957), head basketball coach for St. Norbert College (1934–1943, 1944–1945)	
Ralph McKinzie	Iota / Eureka College	Head football coach for Eureka College (1921–1937), where he coached Ronald Reagan, and Wartburg College (1938–1939), head basketball coach for Eureka College (1921–1937), Wartburg College (1938–1940), and Northern Illinois University (1940–1948), head baseball coach for Northern Illinois University (1945, 1949–1956)	
Fred Muhl	Alpha / Illinois Wesleyan University	Quarterback for the University of Illinois (1903), head football coach (1906, 1909–1920), head basketball coach (1910–1921), and head baseball coach (1926) for Illinois Wesleyan University	
Bill Neal	Alpha-Pi / George Washington University	Lineman for George Washington University (1951–1953), head football coach for Indiana University of Pennsylvania (1970–1978)	
Milton Olander	Gamma / University of Illinois	Tackle for the University of Illinois (1918–1921), head football coach for Western Michigan University (1922–1923) and assistant football coach for the University of Illinois (1924–1934)	
Jim Reid	Beta-Upsilon / University of Maine	Defensive back for the University of Maine (1970–1972), head football coach for University of Massachusetts Amherst (1986–1991), University of Richmond (1995–2003), and Virginia Military Institute (2006–2007)	
John L. Smith	Alpha-Chi / University of Louisville	Linebacker and quarterback for Weber State University (1968–1970), head football coach for the University of Idaho (1989–1994), Utah State University (1995–1997), University of Louisville (1998–2002), Michigan State University (2003–2006), University of Arkansas (2012), Fort Lewis College (2013–2015), and Kentucky State University (2016–2018)	
Jud Timm	Gamma / University of Illinois	Halfback for the University of Illinois (1926–1929), head football coach for Widener University (1930–1938) and Moravian University (1939–1941), head basketball coach for Widener University (1930–1936, 1937–1938), head track and field coach for Princeton University (1942–1947)	
Merle Wendt	Omicron / Ohio State University	Three-time All-American college football player at Ohio State University (1934–1936)	

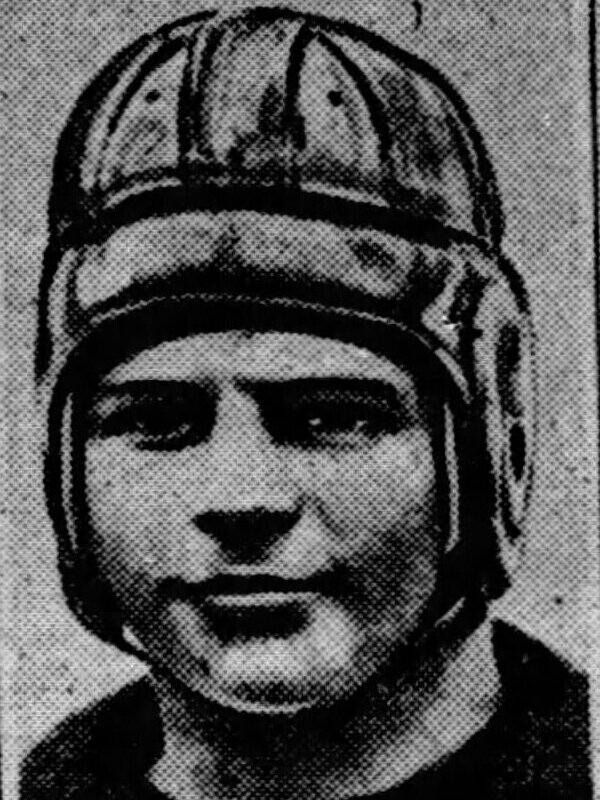
Jud Timm

=== Ice hockey ===
Name / Original chapter / Notability / Ref.; Bob May / Alpha-Sigma / University of North Dakota / Head ice hockey coach for University of North Dakota (1957–1959), won the program's first national championship in the 1959 NCAA men's ice hockey tournament

=== Olympics ===
Name	Original chapter	Notability	Ref.
Douglas Blubaugh	Beta-Gamma / Oklahoma State University	Wrestler who won a gold medal at the 1960 Summer Olympics in the welterweight class in freestyle wrestling	
Sim Iness	Beta-Sigma / University of Southern California	Discus thrower who won a gold medal at the 1952 Summer Olympics and broke the Olympic record multiple times	
Johnny Quinn	Grand Chapter	Member of the four-man bobsled team for the 2014 Winter Olympics, former NFL and CFL wide receiver	
Brian Shimer	Mu-Sigma / Morehead State University	Bobsledder who won a bronze medal at the 2002 Winter Olympics in the four-man bobsleigh competition, won the 1992–1993 Bobsleigh World Cup championships in both the four-man and combined men's events	
Gray Simons	Theta-Gamma / Lock Haven University of Pennsylvania	Wrestler who competed at the 1960 Summer Olympics and the 1964 Summer Olympics in freestyle wrestling, four-time NAIA champion and three-time NCAA champion	
Michael Tayler	Tau-Omega / Carleton University	Canadian slalom canoeist who competed at the 2012 Summer Olympics, 2016 Summer Olympics, and 2020 Summer Olympics	

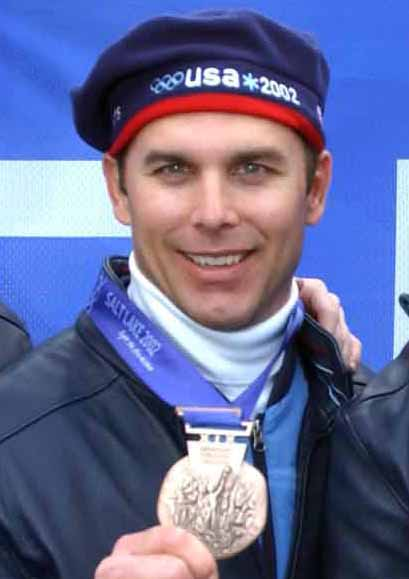
Brian Shimer

=== Soccer ===
Name	Original chapter	Notability	Ref.
Alan Placek	Gamma-Psi / Butler University	Professional soccer player for the Mid-Michigan Bucks (1996–1997, 1999–2000) and the Windsor Border Stars (2004)	
Shea Salinas	Gamma-Mu / Furman University	Professional soccer player for the San Jose Earthquakes (2012–2022)	

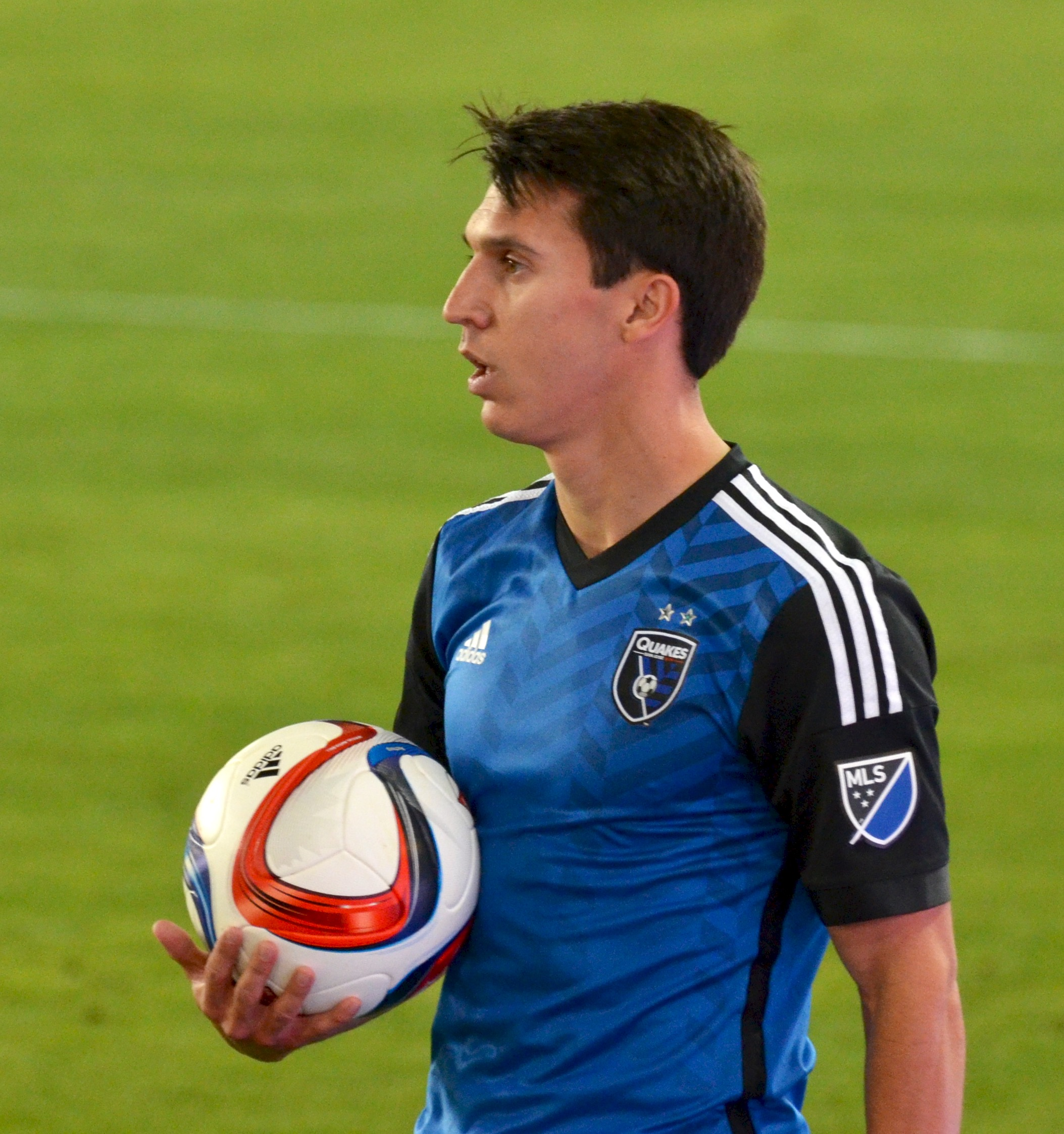
Shea Salinas

=== Tennis ===
Name	Original chapter	Notability	Ref.
Tim Gullikson	Delta-Eta / Northern Illinois University	Professional tennis player who won 15 top-level doubles titles, 10 of them partnering with his identical twin brother Tom Gullikson, runner-up in the men's doubles competition in the 1983 Wimbledon Championships, tennis coach for Pete Sampras (1992–1995)	
Tom Gullikson	Delta-Eta / Northern Illinois University	Professional tennis player who won 15 top-level doubles titles, 10 of them partnering with his identical twin brother Tim Gullikson, runner-up in the men's doubles competition in the 1983 Wimbledon Championships, tennis coach for Pete Sampras (2001–2002)	

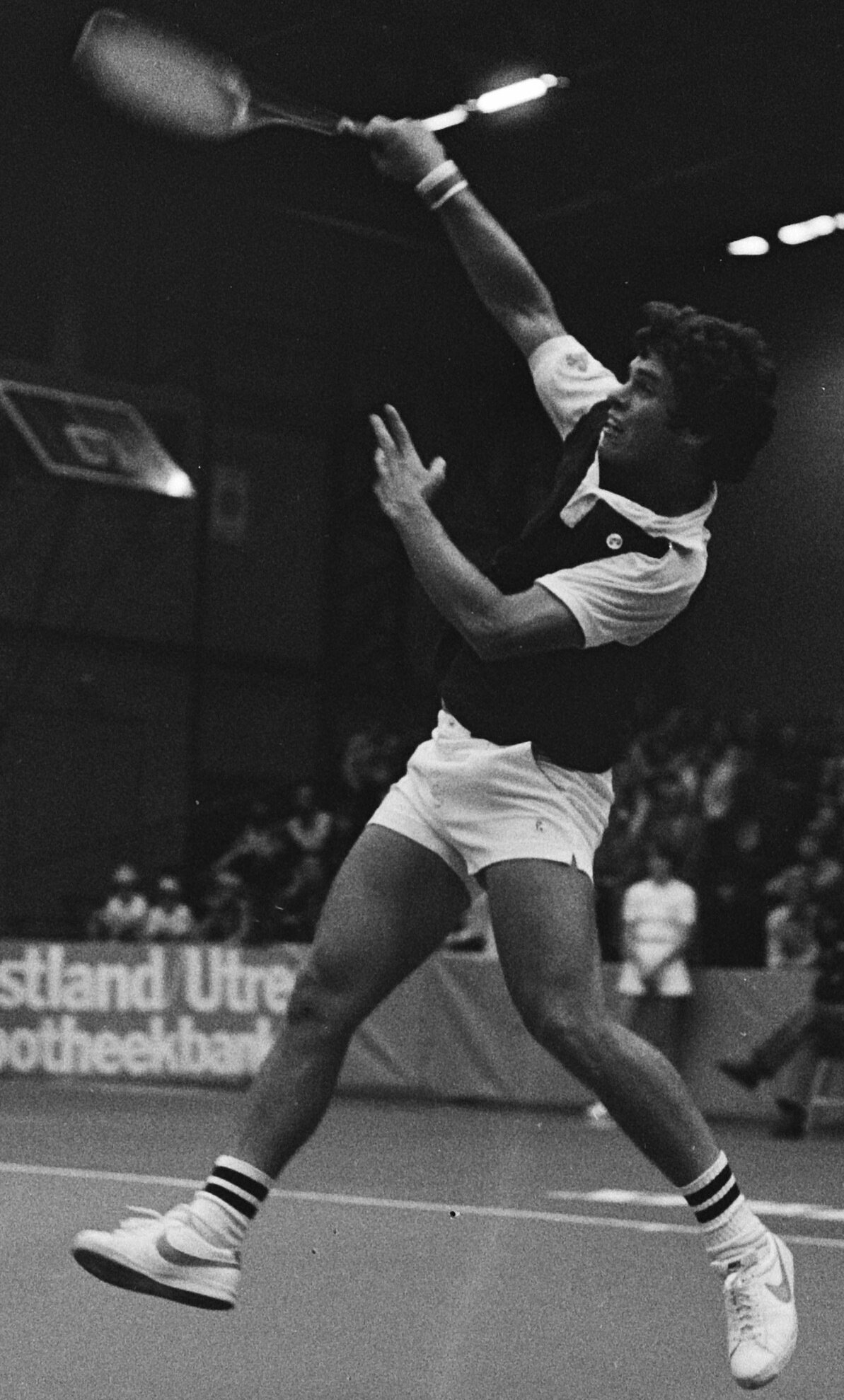
Tim Gullikson

=== Track and field ===
Name / Original chapter / Notability / Ref.; Jim Allen / Alpha-Gamma / Washington State University / Hurdler who won a silver medal in the 440-yard hurdles event at the 1963 USA Outdoor Track and Field Championships

=== Wrestling and Boxing ===
Name	Original chapter	Notability	Ref.
Ole Anderson	Theta-Rho / St. Cloud State University	Professional wrestler and a founding member of The Four Horsemen	
Charlie Haas	Iota-Rho / Seton Hall University	Professional wrestler best known for his appearances with WWE in the 2000s and Ring of Honor in the 2010s	
Roy Jones Jr.	Tau-Psi / University of West Florida	WBC, WBA, IBF, WBF, IBO, NBA, and IBA light heavyweight championship professional boxer	
Mark Madden	Nu-Phi / Duquesne University	Talk-show host best known for his work as color commentator for World Championship Wrestling (1994–2001)	
Paul Wight Jr.	Xi-Beta / Southern Illinois University Edwardsville	Professional wrestler also known by his in-ring name "The Big Show"	

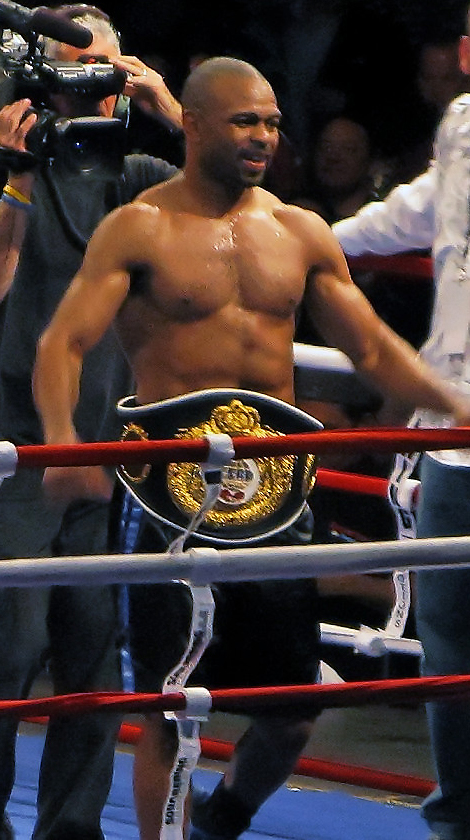
Roy Jones Jr.

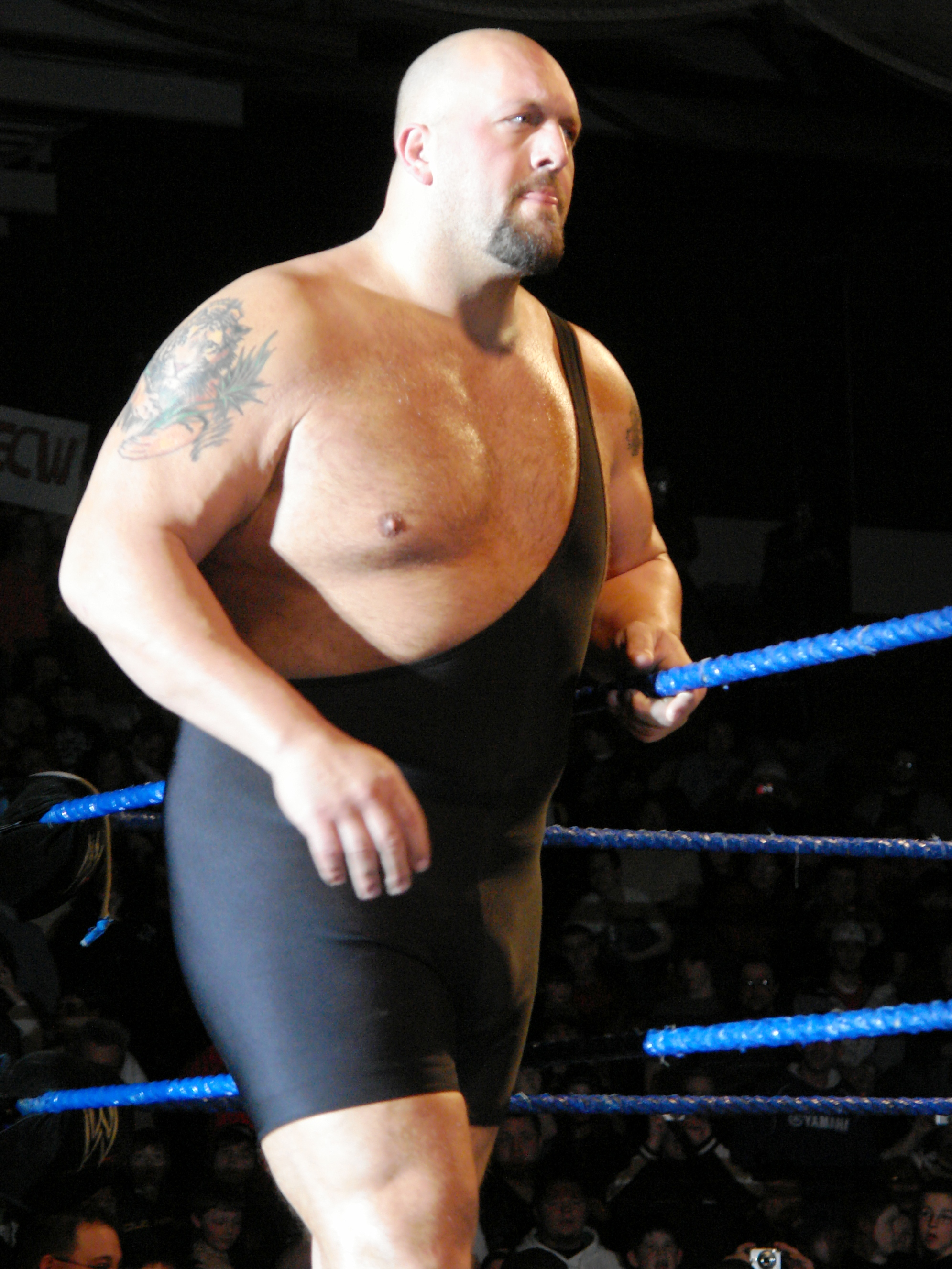
Paul Wight Jr.
