= Alabuga Special Economic Zone =

Special economic zone in Yelabuzhsky District, Tatarstan, Russia

Coordinates: 55.8315°N 52.0349°E

Special economic zone "Alabuga"
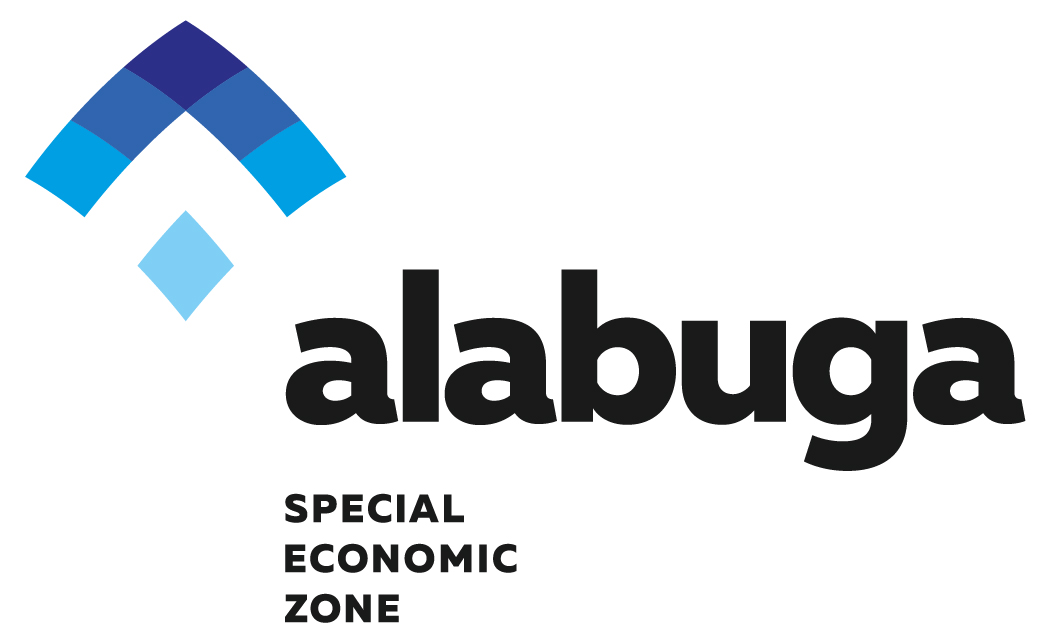

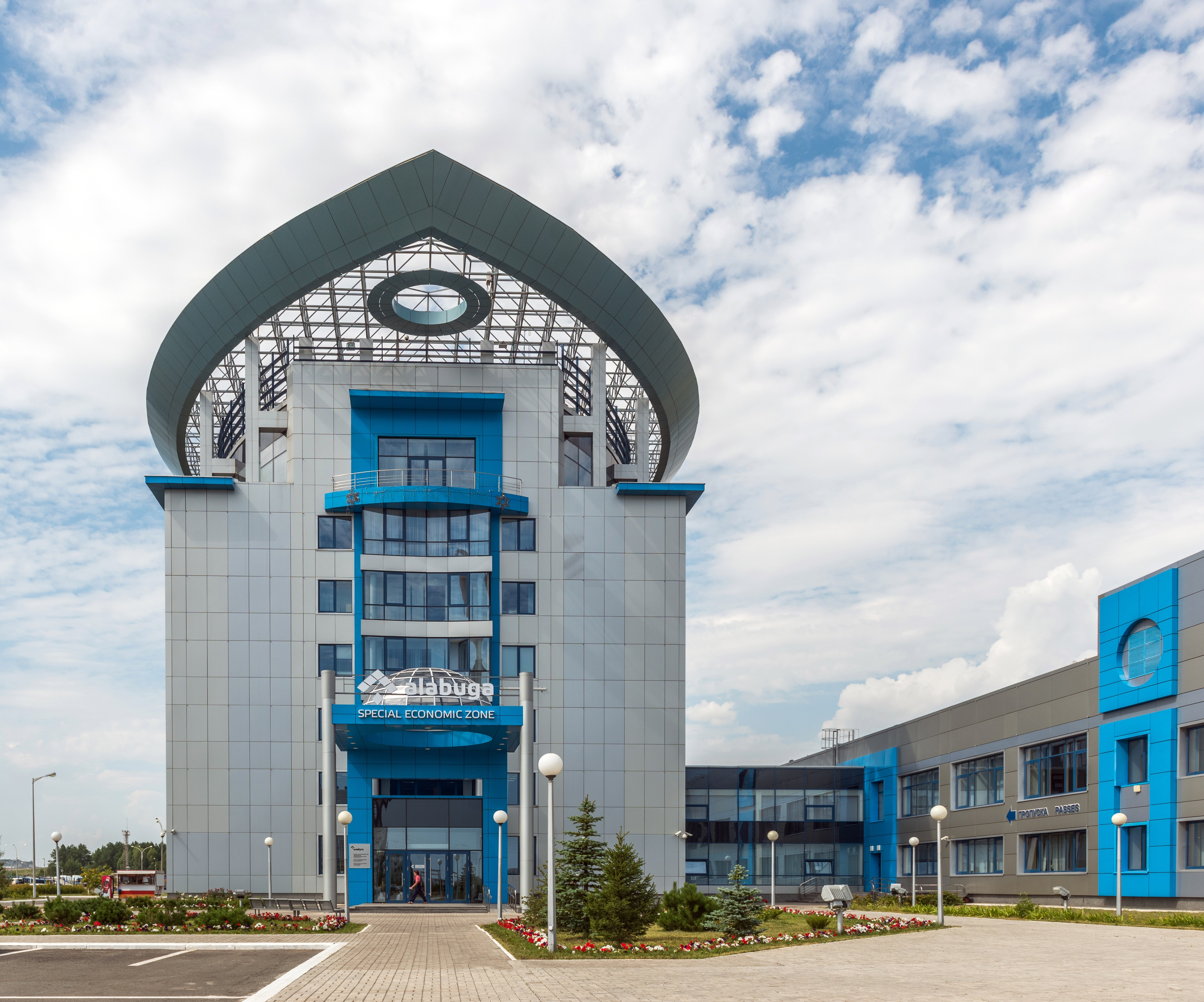
- Type: Joint-stock company
- Founded: 21 December 2005; 20 years ago
- Headquarters: The Republic of Tatarstan, Yelabuga region, Yelabuga, the territory of the SEZ "Alabuga", Russia
- Area served: The Republic of Tatarstan, Yelabuga region, Yelabuga, the territory of the SEZ "Alabuga"
- Key people: Timur Shagivaleev (CEO), Rustam Minnikhanov (Chairman of the Supervisory Board)
- Revenue: 11.93 mln US Dollars (2015)
- Operating income: −7.88 mln US Dollars (2015)
- Net income: −6,38 mln US Dollars (2015)
- Total assets: 409 mln US Dollars (2015)
- Owner: Ministry of Land and Property of the Republic of Tatarstan (100%)
- Number of employees: 698 (2015)
- Website: alabuga.ru

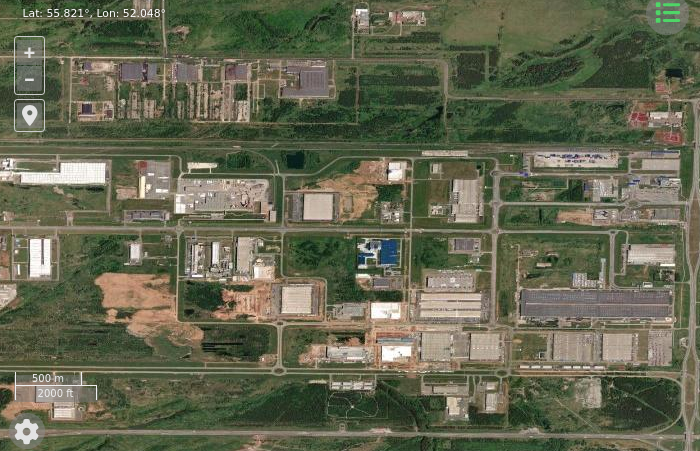
Satellite imagery of the Alabuga SEZ

Alabuga (Russian: Алабуга) is a special economic zone of an industrial and production type located in a 20 km^{2} area in the Yelabuzhsky District of the Republic of Tatarstan in the Kama Innovative Territorial Production Cluster 10 km from Yelabuga, 25 km from Naberezhnye Chelny, 40 km from Nizhnekamsk and 210 km from the regional center — Kazan. The shareholders of the management company of the SEZ "Alabuga" are the Russian Federation through the JSC "Special Economic Zones" with 100% state participation (Ministry of Land and Property of the Republic of Tatarstan).

As of 2016–2017, "Alabuga" is the largest and most successful special economic zone of industrial and production type in Russia, accounting for 68% of total revenue (2017) and 42% of tax collections from all SEZs of the country (2016), providing 54% of private investment in Russian SEZ (2016).

Controversy has emerged around claims of deceitful labor practices in Alabuga's factories where Shahed 136 drones are produced for Russia's military. In May 2025, the Global Initiative Against Transnational Organized Crimes released a report with evidence that over 300 women aged 18–22 have been recruited from around the world, mostly Africa and Latin America, under allegedly false pretenses of a "work-study program," to be sent to these drone factories in Alabuga. The deceptive and manipulative "Alabuga Start" program has recruited low-skilled workers from 27 countries with promises of a high salary, work training, accommodations, and integration into Russian society.

== History ==
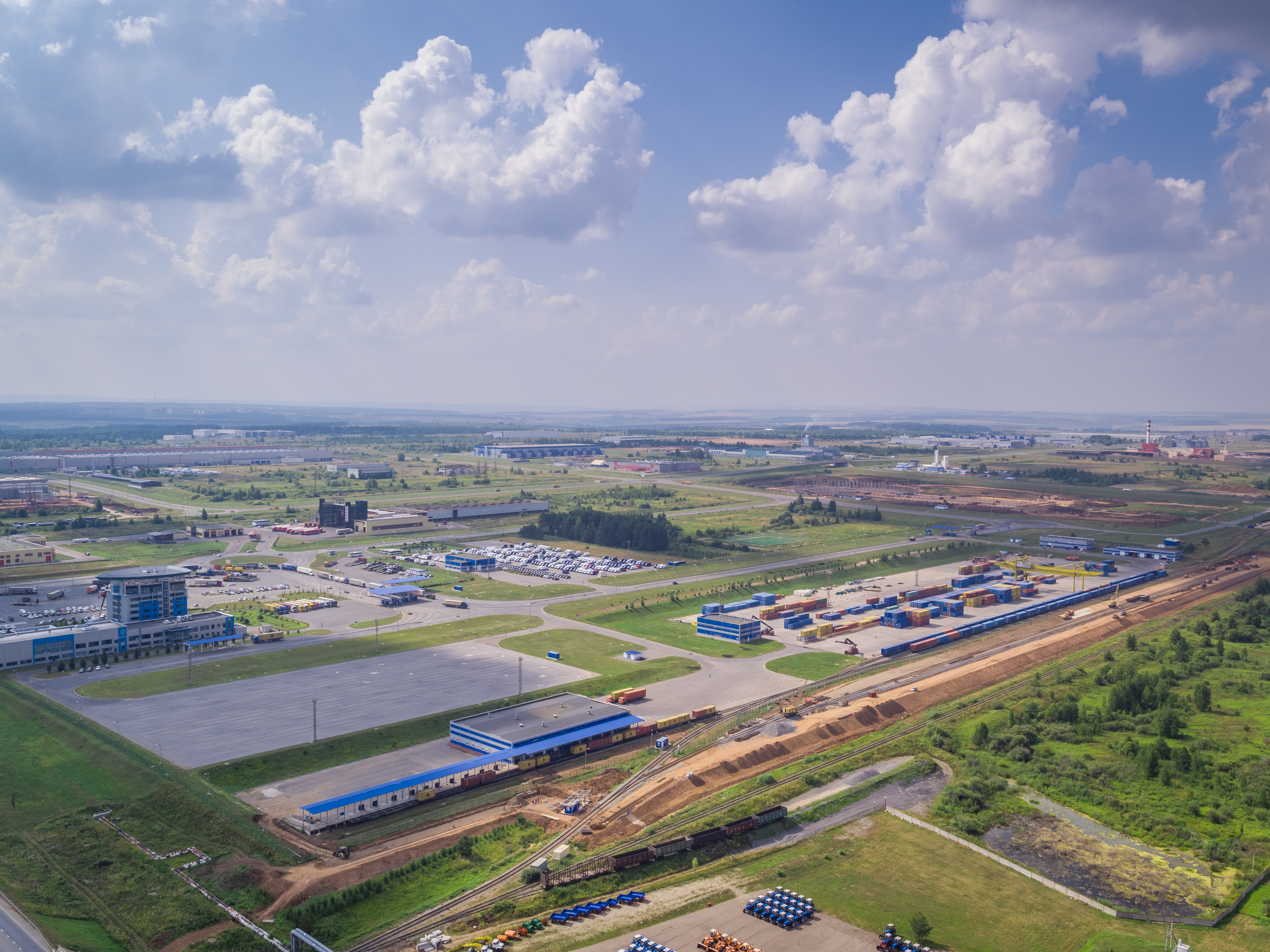
View of the SEZ "Alabuga", 2017 year

=== Yelabuga Automobile Plant ===
In the 1980s, the right bank of the Kama river was a promising industrial centre. In the vicinity of Naberezhnye Chelny, the auto road and railways communications were established; KamAZ was showing new industrial capacities; the Plant of Transport Electrical Equipment and the Cardboard and Paper combine enterprise and the Nizhnekamsk hydroelectric station were launched. In 1984, the Council of Ministers of the USSR decided to build a Kamsky Tractor Plant (KamTZ) in the Yelabuga area, including a universal tractors plant, along with an engine plant, a fueling equipment, a turbocharger, a foundry and forging and a machine tool producing plants.

Nikolay Bekh, the director of the "KamAZ" foundry plant, headed the Directorate of the future plant. The general plan of "KamTZ" was prepared under his supervision. The project, commissioned by the Ministry of Tractor and Agricultural Machinery of the USSR, was designed by "Giprotractorselkhozmash" from Kharkiv; its main contractor was the production association "Kamgesenergostroy". The first cubic meter of concrete was laid in the foundation of the future plant on 12 October 1984, and the next year the construction of apartment houses, factory buildings, boiler station, treatment facilities and the road from the highway Kazan - Naberezhnye Chelny highway to the plant site were launched. By 1988, six buildings of the plant were installed, a combined heat power plant was built, 90 kilometres of high-pressure gas pipeline from Udmurtia were laid, and four samples of an experimental tractor were put up, but Mikhail Gorbachev doubted the expediency of a huge tractor production. In July 1988, the Council of Ministers decided to reorganize KamTZ into the Yelabuga Automobile Plant (YelAZ), which was subordinated to the Ministry of the Automobile Industry by order of 9 August 1988.

It was planned to launch a mass production of city cars, "Oka" in particular, on the YelAZ site in 1989–1995. The plant also negotiated the creation of a joint venture with Fiat for the production of Fiat Panda and the jointly developed "A93" model, but the Italian company delayed the signing of the contract, waiting for the political crisis resolution on which the project financing depended. Because of a lack of funds, the launch of YelAZ was postponed from 1991 to 1992. In November 1991, Gorbachev put the plant to the jurisdiction of the Republic of Tatarstan and, thanks to the support of the President of Tatarstan, Mintimer Shaimiev, the enterprise managed to avoid closure after the collapse of the Soviet Union. The main subdivision of YelAZ in the 1990s was the machine tool producing factory, which was launched in 1992 and supplied large car manufacturing factories and oil refineries. When in 1997 it reached the breakeven point, about one thousand people worked on a territory of 100 thousand sq meters. The republican authorities also revived the idea of car production and in late 1995 reached crucial agreements with the concern of General Motors. In early 1996, a joint venture "YelAZ-General Motors" was established with $250 million of authorised capital, 25% of which belonged to US investors, the rest — in equal shares to Tatarstan and Russia. The Chevrolet Blazer SUVs, produced in Brazil, were assembled at the YelAZ-General Motors sites, and ElAZ directly dealt with third-party orders for tools, machine tools and spare parts, and together with the French company produced beet harvesters.

The first 120 Chevrolets left the assembly line in March 1997, and by the end of 1998, it was planned to open a production complex of a joint venture in the 601st building of the industrial site and to increase car production to 50 thousand per year. The Yelabuga — Kazan — Moscow — St. Petersburg dealer network began to work, and to reduce the car selling price, the government of the Republic of Tatarstan reduced the property tax rate for "YelAZ-General Motors". However, the financing of the tripartite project was slipping: for example, in mid-1997, journalists pointed out that only 20 million roubles (3.456 mln US Dollars) instead of 120 (20.74 mln US Dollars) were delivered from the Republican budget, while the Russian Federation provided only 1.7 million (0.294 mln US Dollars). After that, the existing mechanism of the project funding was abolished by order of the Russian president on 8 July 1997.

=== Free economic zone ===
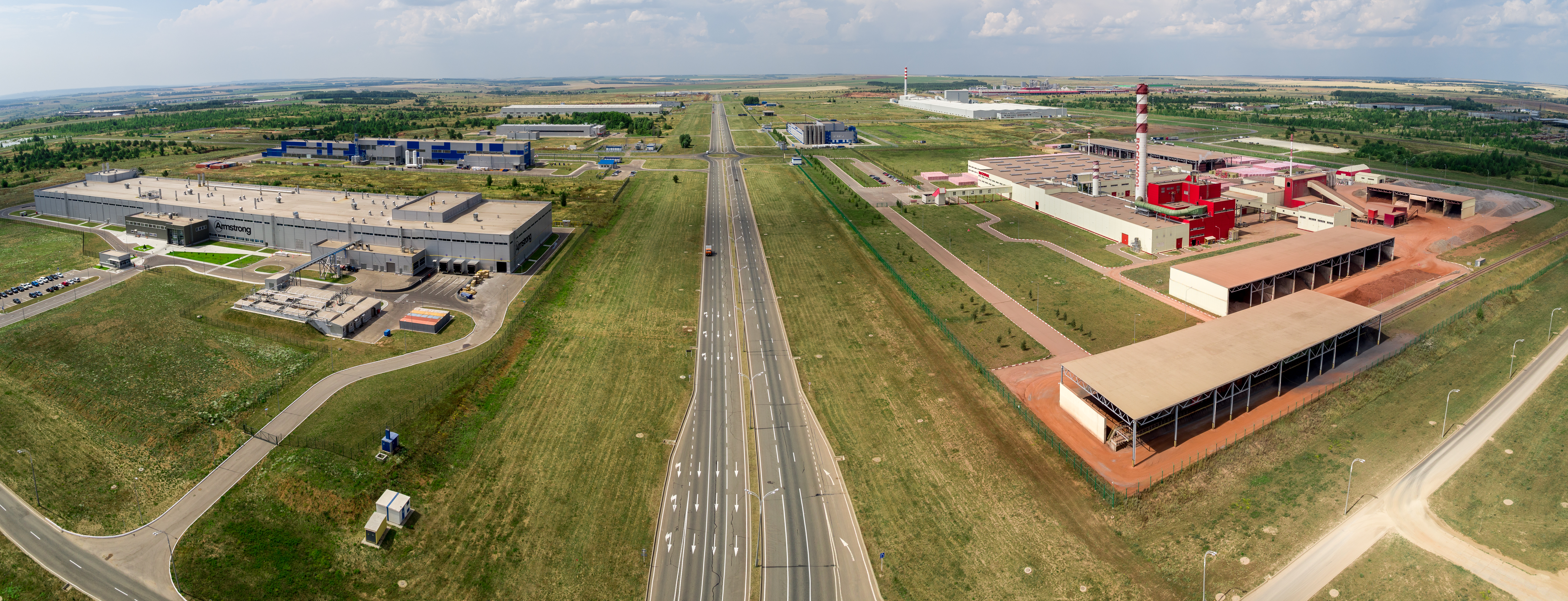
View of street SH-2 from the East

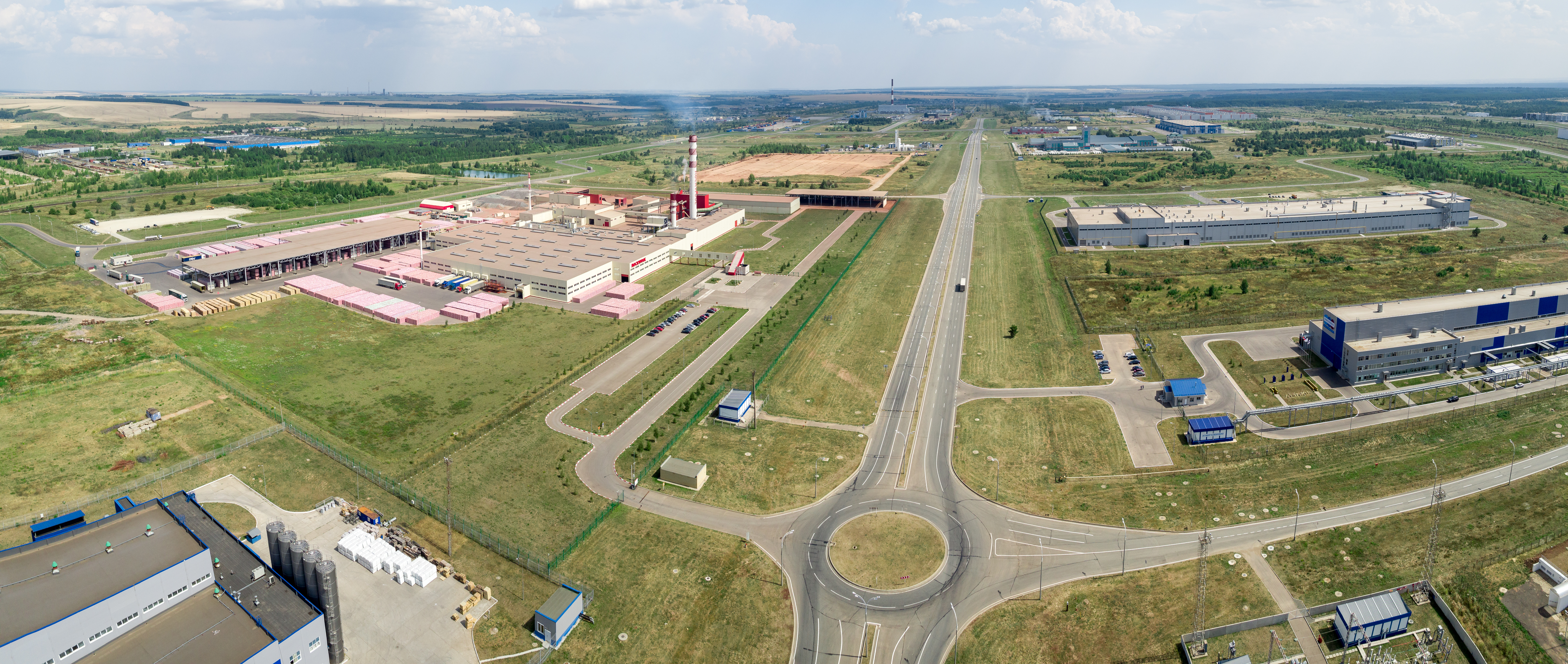
View of street SH-2 from the West

In order to attract funding and to overcome unemployment in Yelabuga, the republican government turned to the widespread practice in Russia of the 1990s of creating free economic zones designed to stimulate the regional economy through tax breaks and the attraction of foreign capital. The Law of the Republic of Tatarstan "On Free Economic Zone «Alabuga»" was adopted on 22 April 1998, by 33 votes of deputies of the State Council of the Republic of Tatarstan; one deputy voted against it. The FEZ regulations were developed together with the Customs Committee of the Russian Federation, the Ministry of Finance of the Russian Federation, and the State Committee for Property Management of the Republic of Tatarstan. The FEZ residents were exempt from all tax payments, except for unified social tax and personal income tax. Despite the fact that in 2001 the American company left the joint venture "ElAZ — General Motors", the FEZ continued its work. By 2003, 13 companies were located in the FEZ, including the "Skantat" joint venture with Volvo, which produces buses on the KamAZ chassis; the Minski Traktarny Zavod tractor production; the meat-processing plant "Modul", the car chemicals production "D Plast-Eftek; the manufacturer of special machinery on the cargo chassis "AutoMaster"; a factory of office furniture and trade equipment "ElTons"; the manufacturer of building components "DSK KMK" and the joint venture for the heaters production "Delonghi — ZASS «Alabuga»".

The law "On Free Economic Zone «Alabuga»" contained some fundamental differences from federal legislation related to the industrial and production specificity of the site and the desire of the Tatarstan authorities to avoid the use of FEZ for tax evasion. The republican prosecutor's office considered that these differences contained violations of the Civil Code that restrict citizens' rights to engage in entrepreneurial activities, and protested the law during the discussion of the amendments in September 2001. Deputies of the State Council of Tatarstan appealed to the economic expediency of "Alabuga", but the prosecutor's office was not satisfied with these arguments and demanded that Supreme Court of Tatarstan regards the law as contradicting the federal legislation. The Supreme Court of Tatarstan refused to do it, and the Tatarstan prosecutor's office appealed against the decision in the Supreme Court of the Russian Federation. Despite the absence of a direct ban on the creation of free economic zones with special economic regimes in the federal legislation, the Supreme Court of Russia took the side of the prosecutor's office, and qualified the creation of FEZ to be beyond the powers of the Tatarstan State Council and on 21 March 2003, abolished the law "On free economic zone «Alabuga»". On 23 April 2003, the State Council officially terminated the law on the territory of the republic.

=== Directorate of investment programs ===
To fulfil the obligations to provide tax benefits and implement investment projects for the residents of the free economic zone, the Government of Tatarstan established the "Directorate of investment programs on the territory of the industrial site «Alabuga»", which fully complied with federal legislation. The Directorate became the legal successor of the free economic zone, and the former territory of the FEZ was transferred to its management. In 2004, four production projects with 3 million dollars of investment were launched on the site.

=== Special economic zone ===
The Tatarstan project attracted the attention of the Ministry of Economic Development of the Russian Federation during the work on the new law regulating free economic zones. Representatives of the Directorate of investment programs were invited to the working group for drafting the bill, and after the adoption of the law "On special economic zones" in July–August 2005, Herman Gref visited Yelabuga. The project of the special economic zone in Yelabuga became one of the winners of the competition for the creation of the first two SEZs. On 21 December 2005, the Government of the Russian Federation issued Resolution No. 784 "On the establishment of a special economic zone of industrial type on the territory of the Yelabuga district of the Republic of Tatarstan". The tripartite agreement, signed on 18 January 2006 between the Ministry of Economic Development and Trade of the Russian Federation, the Government of the Republic of Tatarstan and the administration of Yelabuga municipal district, obliged the Russian Federation and the Republic of Tatarstan to jointly finance the engineering, transport and social infrastructure of the SEZ. The open joint-stock company "Special economic zone of industrial and production type «Alabuga»" (JSC "SEZ IPT «Alabuga»") was established on 24 July 2006. JSC "Special Economic Zones", completely owned by the Russian Federation and the Ministry land and property relations of the Republic of Tatarstan, became its shareholder. The Grand opening of SEZ Alabuga was held on 20 November 2007. It was attended by the President of Tatarstan Mintimer Shaimiev, the head of the Federal Agency for Management of Special Economic Zones Mikhail Mishustin, the Minister of Economic Development and Trade Elvira Nabiullina, the Deputy Minister of Industry and Energy Denis Manturov and the Deputy Prime Minister Sergei Ivanov.

=== International Sanctions ===
Alabuga Special Economic Zone has been designated by multiple international bodies following its role in drone production for the Russo-Ukrainian war.

The entity is sanctioned by: the United States (OFAC; US SAM procurement exclusions), the European Union (European Union sanctions, December 2023), the United Kingdom (FCDO Sanctions), Switzerland (SECO, December 2023), Australia (DFAT Consolidated List), France, Belgium, Monaco, New Zealand, Ukraine (NSDC and GUR), Japan (MoF, METI), and Taiwan (MOEA export controls).

== Shahed-136 drone assembly ==
Russia built factories to assemble the Shahed 136, with plans for over 2,400 workers in Alabuga. Initial plans were for 100 units per month to be reassembled (as a knock-down kit) by January 2023. Initial shipments arrived at Begishevo Airport and included some Shahed 131 drones. Indigenous production of the airframes was scheduled to begin in April 2023, and full production of 226 units per month by January 2024. Russia will need an indigenous engine to replace Iran's Mado-cloned Limbach L550E. Conflict Armament Research confirmed that Russian-produced drones were in use by July 2023. On 2 April 2024, the drone factory was struck by a private plane-sized drone, reportedly hitting a dormitory on the grounds. The aircraft involved was later identified as an Aeroprakt A-22 Foxbat, which had been modified into an unmanned configuration for use in the attack.

== Infrastructure ==
=== Engineering networks ===
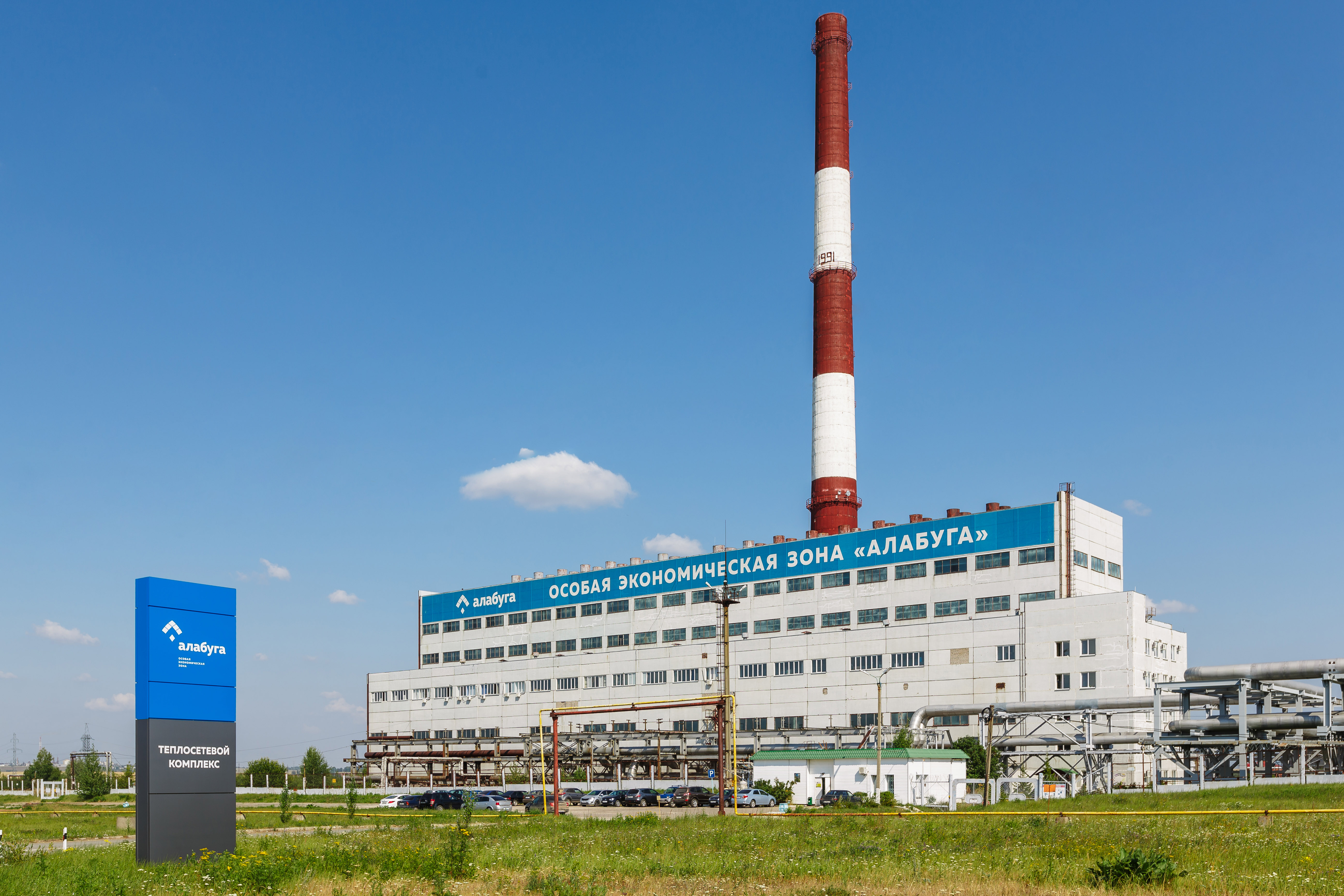
Heating system complex

Power supply of "Alabuga" comes through high-voltage substations "Toima-2" with a capacity of 100 MW and "Shchelokov-500" with a capacity of 250 MW. A 600 MW distribution substation, designed to minimize the risks of voltage change and provide uninterrupted power supply even if power supply from one of the substations would be cut off, was put into operation. Water supply is organised through a purification station that receives water from the water intake "Turaevo", located 65 km from "Alabuga". Household sewage of resident enterprises undergo treatment at local treatment facilities and, through the system of self-pressure sewerage, are directed to treatment facilities of Yelabuga municipal district. Heating supply of "Alabuga" is provided by the heat sources of resident companies and operating boiler houses of Yelabuga power and heating plant with a (designed) heat output of 420 Gcal/h. For a long time the enterprise did not produce electricity and specialised in delivering heat to "Alabuga", and in September 2016 the management company of the FEZ bought the PHP from the "Generating Company" in order to attract large heat consumers. Gas supply is being carried out from the gas distribution station "Central" of the gas pipeline "Mozhga — Yelabuga".

=== Logistics ===
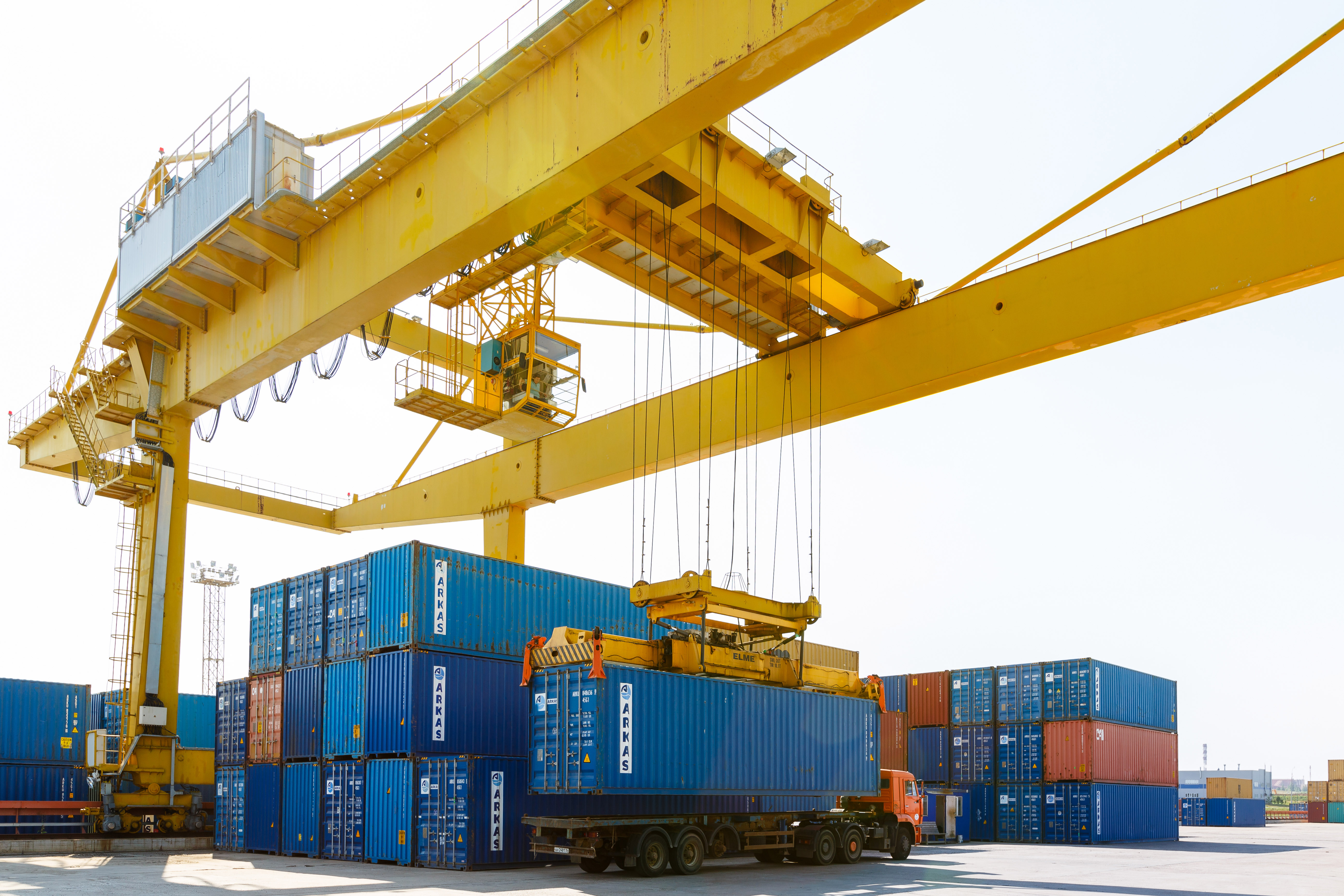
Container platform

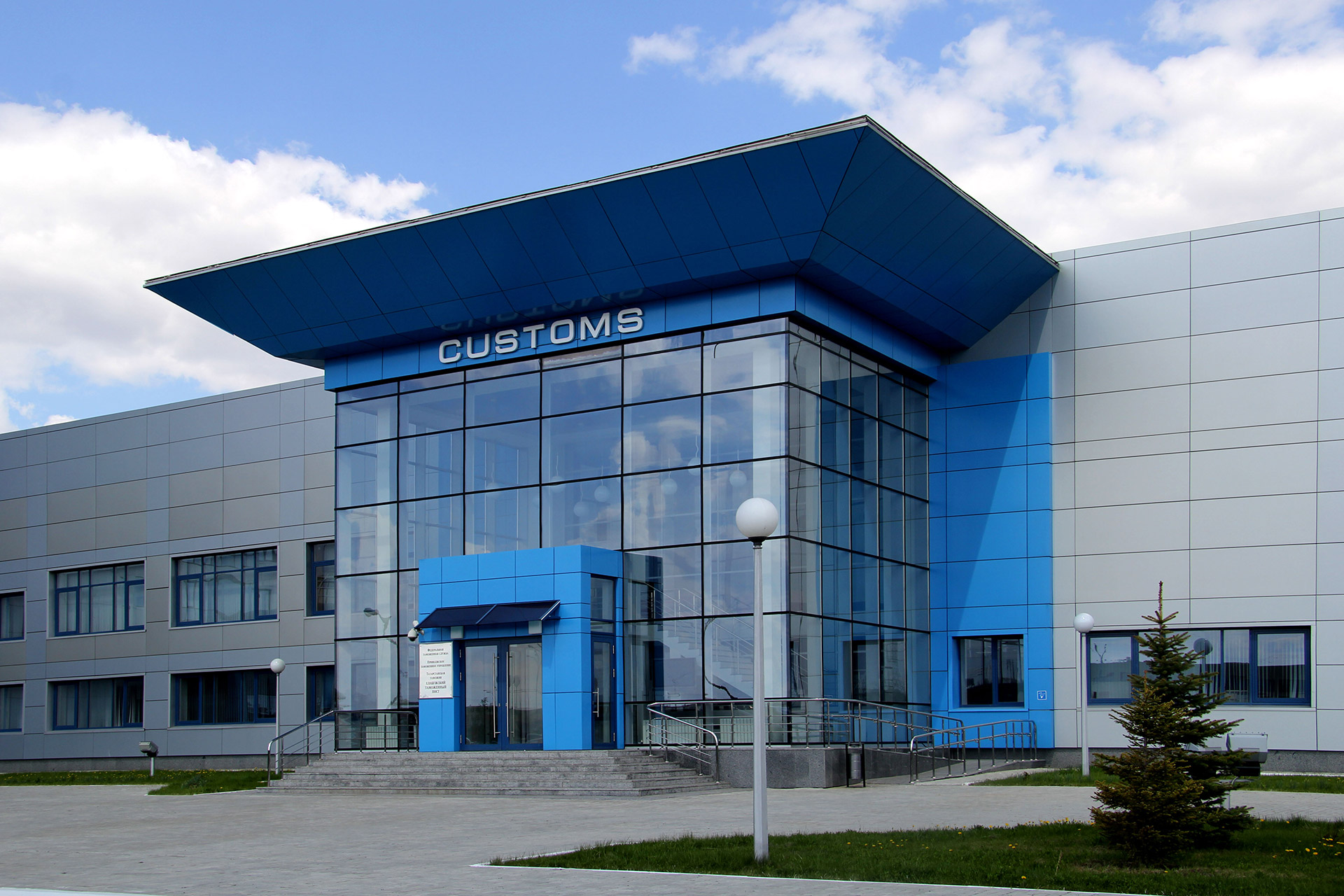
Customs

Transport accessibility of "Alabuga" is provided by a two-kilometre road that connects the site with the federal highway M7, a river communication with access to the Unified Deep Water System of European Russia through the ports in Naberezhnye Chelny and Nizhnekamsk, the international airport Begishevo and non-public railway to Tikhonovo station at the Kuybyshev Railway. In 2016, the SEZ management company planned the construction of an additional railway line to meet the growing needs of the residents. A cargo express is planned to be launched in 2017, which will connect the Kuibyshev and Gorky Railway, and will run along the route Sukhobozvodnoye-Tikhonovo and supply quartz sand to Alabuga for the glass production.

An equipped container platform for cargo shipment has been operating in Alabuga since January 2008. Yelabuga customs post of the Tatarstan customs office, established a year earlier, started working in April 2008. The area of its activity is limited by the territory of the SEZ "Alabuga". The on-site post with 46 employees has been located in the administrative and business centre and became part of the "one-stop-shop" system for resident companies. The free customs zone was opened in Alabuga along with the customs post. According to the results of 2014, Yelabuga customs post was declared the best customs post in Russia.

=== Industrial parks ===
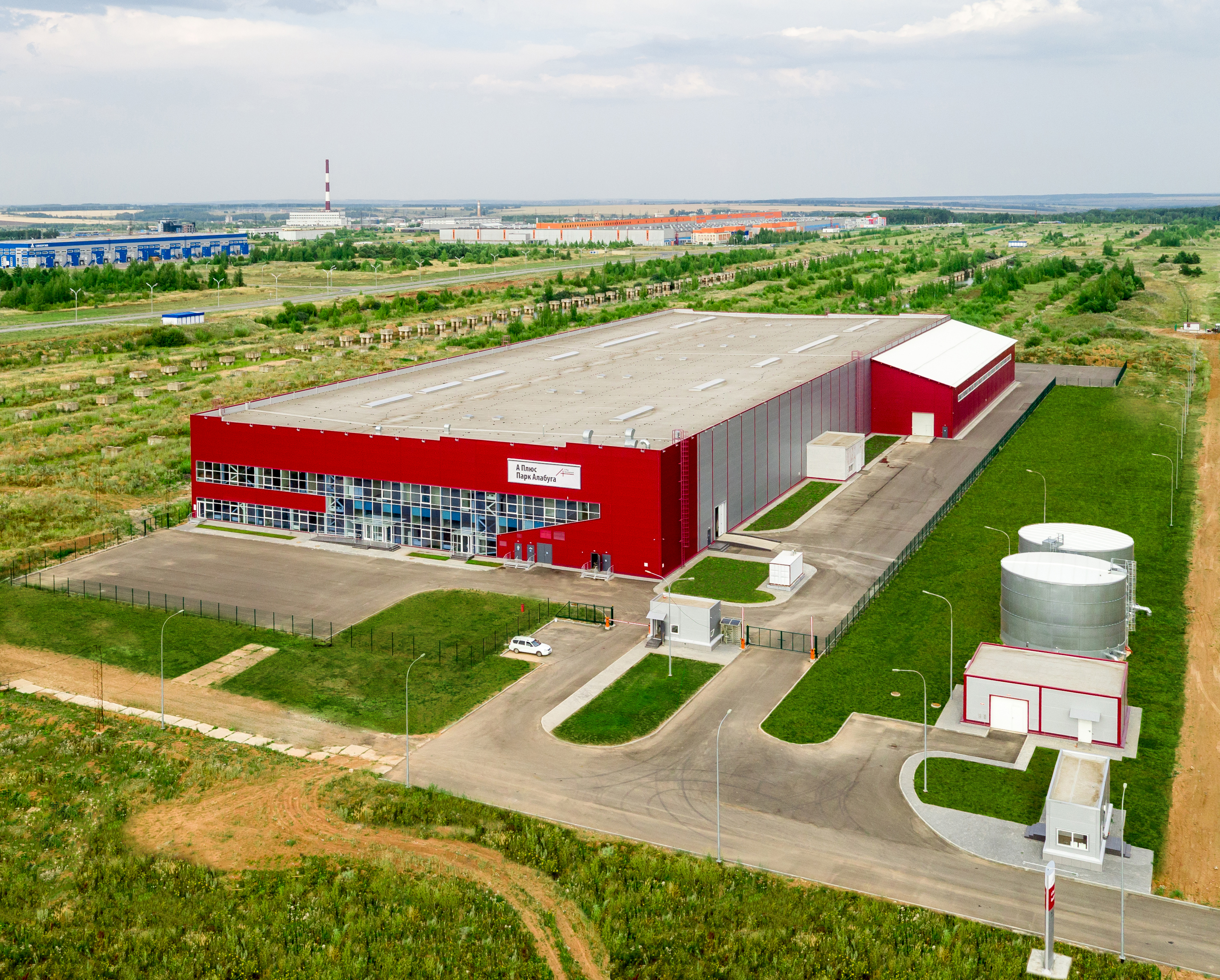
Industrial park "A Plus Park Alabuga"

In 2015, two industrial parks were opened on the territory of "Alabuga": "Synergy" and "A Plus Park Alabuga", whose sites are rented by resident companies for production purposes. "Synergy", which is an area of 24500 m^{2}, offers standard modules of two types, including production areas as well as administrative and utility spaces. 200 thousand m^{2} of the industrial area, warehouses and A-class office space are available in "A Plus Park Alabuga".

=== Social infrastructure ===
Plans for the SEZ "Alabuga" development include construction of housing for employees of resident companies. The "Three Bears" suburban settlement with a total area of 40.47 hectares, located 7 km from the SEZ, was completed in 2014. The village includes 40 two-storeyed cottages, an international Alabuga International School with advanced study of English, a kindergarten at the school, a house for teachers and specialists, two boiler houses, water intake and water treatment facilities. There are also recreational areas, a public centre, a sports complex, a restaurant and a shop. In October 2016, "Alabuga" acquired the hotel complex Alabuga City Hotel, which opened in 2009 in the historical part of Yelabuga. The SEZ management planned to reprofile the hotel to accommodate employees of resident companies, sent to Alabuga, and in 2017 chose "Ramada" international network to be its operator. Other plans of the SEZ development include the construction of the "Severny" micro-district in Alabuga with an area of 115.9 hectares, which will include 209 individual houses with a total area of 33.4 thousand m^{2} and an apartment building of 242 thousand m^{2}, which will ensure the population of 9453 people. Schools, kindergartens, a public centre and a park area of 19.6 hectares are planned to become a part of the future micro-district.

=== Corporate University ===
Alabuga's corporate university started to work in 2016 - it is a training program for senior executives of the resident companies. Training is based on the case study method, includes master classes on marketing, strategic management and production management, which are conducted by the heads of the SEZ and the resident companies. Within the framework of the educational program, students do training in various divisions of the "Alabuga" Directorate and develop projects to address the real needs of the administration and residents of the SEZ. The second class of students graduated in April 2017.

=== Alabuga Polytech ===
In 2021, Alabuga Polytech, also called Alabuga Polytechnic College, opened in the special economic zone. Despite being called a college, they are formally not an independent educational institution, but rather a division of Yelabuga Polytechnic College. General education subjects are taught by teachers from Yelabuga College.

Students are forced to reenact battles from the Great Patriotic War using paintball markers. The "fascist" flag in these games resembles the flag of Nazi Germany, but instead of a swastika, it features the NATO emblem.

Alabuga Polytech has been the subject of frequent criticisms and accusations, including: forced labor, including forced night shifts; students being denied sick leave; mandatory paintball sessions; corporal punishment; a lack of proper support from the administration in cases of personal difficulties; providing inadequate food and rest between required labour, paintball, and education; understaffed medical services; and being forced to miss classes for mandatory work shifts. There have also been reports of insufficient general education, provided by Yelabuga College, with students remaining at a ninth-grade level of education in general subjects.

At the beginning of the school year, students must face professional paintball players in mandatory paintball sessions as a part of Russian "patriotic" education, allegedly even when physically unwell. Reports have detailed different punishments for losing teams: Running or digging trenches in the rain; expulsion (and a consequent fine); some shot at with paintball guns from three metres; others were reportedly tasked to "storm" a hill, without weapons, with the goal of reaching school faculty who were shooting at the students from the top. The staff were allegedly promised a financial bonus if none of the students could "capture" the hill.

The Alabuga Polytech employment contract stipulates that students who drop out of school or who are expelled are fined between 170,000 and 420,000 rubles. (Note: As of 2023, the average monthly salary in Russia was 74,000 rubles.) The contract is tripartite (signed by three parties), involving Alabuga Polytech, the student, and the student's parents, meaning the student's parents are fined if the student cannot be reached.

The school had attempted marketing in African countries to attract young "mulattos", as they called them, to their education programs and to be used in labour. When conventional marketing failed to attract new students and workers, Alabuga Polytech opted to use students as actors on Tinder and Badoo in a deceptive scheme to convince girls to move to Russia for school. The school targeted girls, as, supposedly, African boys "could be too aggressive and dangerous". In fall 2022, the school managed to attract several dozen people through this scheme. The African students were initially segregated from other students, housed and taught in separate facilities. The African students were employed in low-skill work such as janitorial services, rather than technical work like other students, as the school has no maintenance staff and so the maintenance responsibilities are shifted onto the African students.

In 2021 and 2023, two students of the college, both minors, took their own lives due to harsh treatment and fear of expulsion.

Some students, as young as 15, are employed by the company Albatross in the construction of Russian-made Shahed drones at the Yelabuga drone factory, which are deployed in the Russian invasion of Ukraine. Students were instructed not to tell their parents about the assembly work, or they would be fined 1.5 million to 2 million rubles, per their employment contracts with Alabuga Polytech. Refusal to work would be met with expulsion and thus a fine. In a 2 April 2024 offensive, the drone factory was struck by an improvised Ukrainian drone apparently adapted from a civilian light aircraft, an Aeroprakt A-22. Russian media reported a nearby workers' dormitory was damaged, with 12 students injured.

== Management company and financial indicators ==
=== Management company ===
The managing company of the special economic zone is JSC "SEZ IPT «Alabuga»", whose shareholders are the Russian Federation through the state-owned JSC "Special Economic Zones" (66%) and the Ministry of Land and Property Relations of the Republic of Tatarstan (34%). According to the reports of JSC "SEZ IPT «Alabuga»" of 2014, 590 employees worked for the management company of the special economic zone.

The management company interacts with state authorities and does IR-support of the SEZ. Since 2009, JSC "SEZ IPT «Alabuga»" carries out voluntary certification of quality management. In 2013, Alabuga received a certificate of compliance with the requirements of GOST 9001-2011 (ISO 9001: 2008). In 2014, the Federal Agency for Technical Regulation and Metrology issued to the management company of the SEZ a certificate of compliance of the environmental management system and a certificate of compliance of the health and safety management. The activity of JSC "SEZ IPT «Alabuga»" is controlled by the Board of Director; the General Director performs operational management.

=== Financial indicators ===
"Alabuga" is the largest and most successful special economic zone of industrial and production type in Russia: it accounts for 68% of the total revenue of all SEZs in the country (as of 2017), private capital investments in "Alabuga" make 54% of all funds invested in the SEZ in Russia (as of 2016). By 2017 Alabuga signed contracts for investments totalling 155.8 billion roubles (4.5 billion US Dollars), of which 100.2 billion rubles (3.1 billion US Dollars) were used. The largest foreign investors are from the Netherlands and Turkey. In total, resident companies created more than 5.6 thousand jobs in "Alabuga".

In 2016 "Alabuga" accounted for 42% of the taxes (excluding VAT) of all special economic zones of Russia. From its start to 2016, its residents paid 9.7 billion roubles of taxes (including 2.6 billion roubles, or 42.42 mln US Dollars, in 2015). The President of the Republic of Tatarstan Rustam Minnikhanov estimates the tax revenues to fully cover 25.7 billion roubles of state investments in the infrastructure of "Alabuga" by 2019. According to the plan, by 2023 the number of residents will reach 120, the volume of annual tax deductions — 32 billion roubles a year (476 mln U.S. Dollars at the average annual exchange rate of the ruble to the dollar in 2016).

== Residents ==
The procedure of obtaining the status of the resident is defined by law: a company must register legal entity in Yelabuga municipal area and present a business plan with investments not less than 120 million roubles. The application is considered by the Alabuga supervisory board. The average period of obtaining the status of a resident is three months. By October 2017, 57 companies were registered as residents, 23 plants were put into service, others being under construction or projected in Alabuga.

=== Tax regime ===
Taxation of the Alabuga residents is carried out in accordance with the Russian laws of the special economic zones. The resident companies have some tax preferences and benefits, defined by federal legislation and legislation of Tatarstan.

- Corporate tax is 2% for the first five years, 7% for years 6-10 and 15,5% until 2055. The term counts from the date the company receives its first profit. (According to the law of the Republic of Tatarstan of 10 February 2006 #5-ЗРТ);
- Property tax — 0% for 10 years since the tax base formation. The period can be extended by the law of the Republic of Tatarstan (According to the paragraph 17 of article No.381 of the tax code of the Russian Federation);
- The Alabuga residents are exempt from transport tax for 10 years since registering the vehicle (According to the law of the Republic of Tatarstan of 29 November 2002 # 24-ЗРТ) and land value tax for the same period since the property title to the area accrues (By the decision of Yelabuga municipal district council of 25 January 2006 #38);
- According to the Free economic zone regime, the imported equipment and products used in the territory of Alabuga are exempt from the customs duties (10%) and the value-added tax (18%).

=== Operating enterprises ===
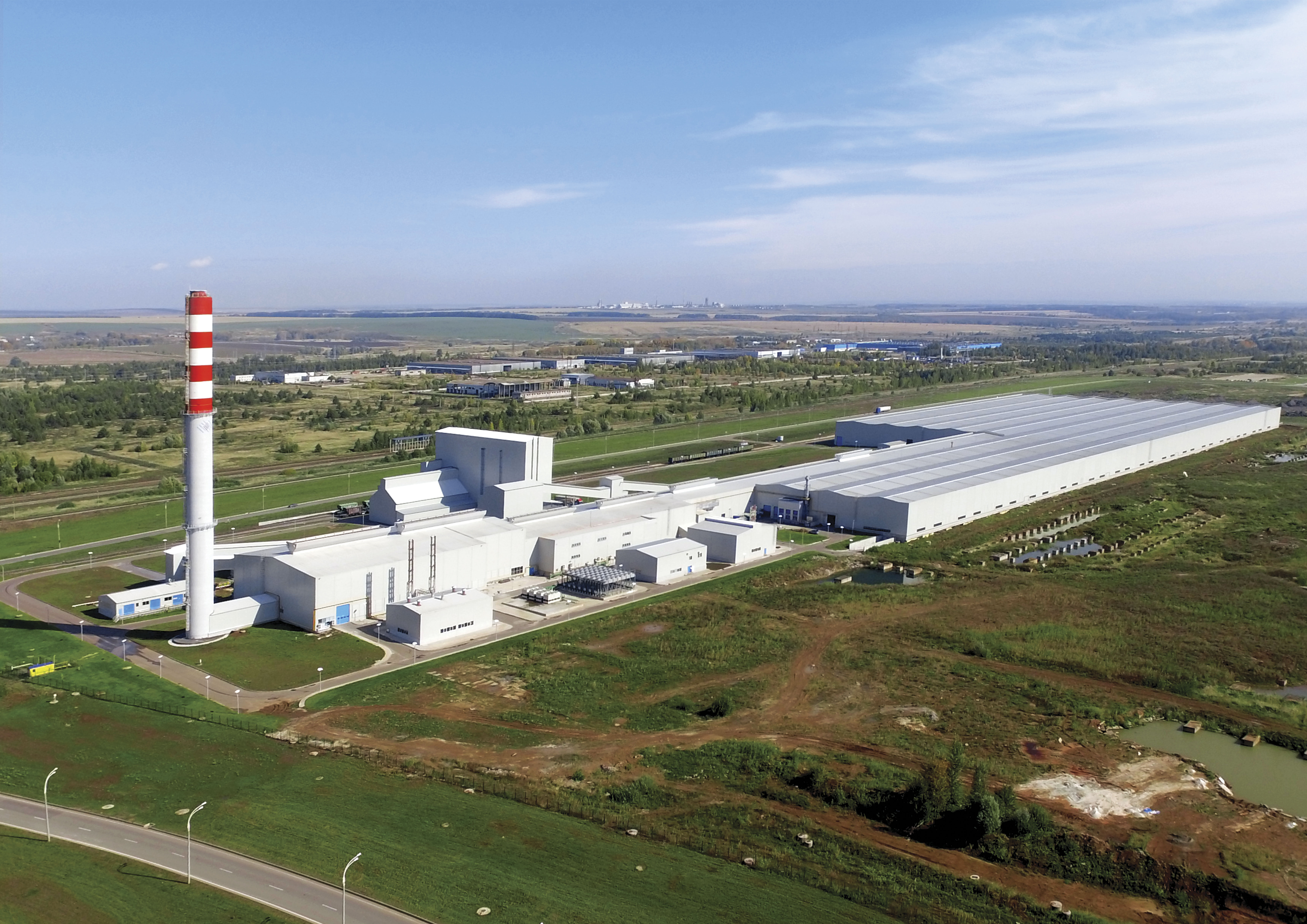
"Trakya Glass Rus" plant

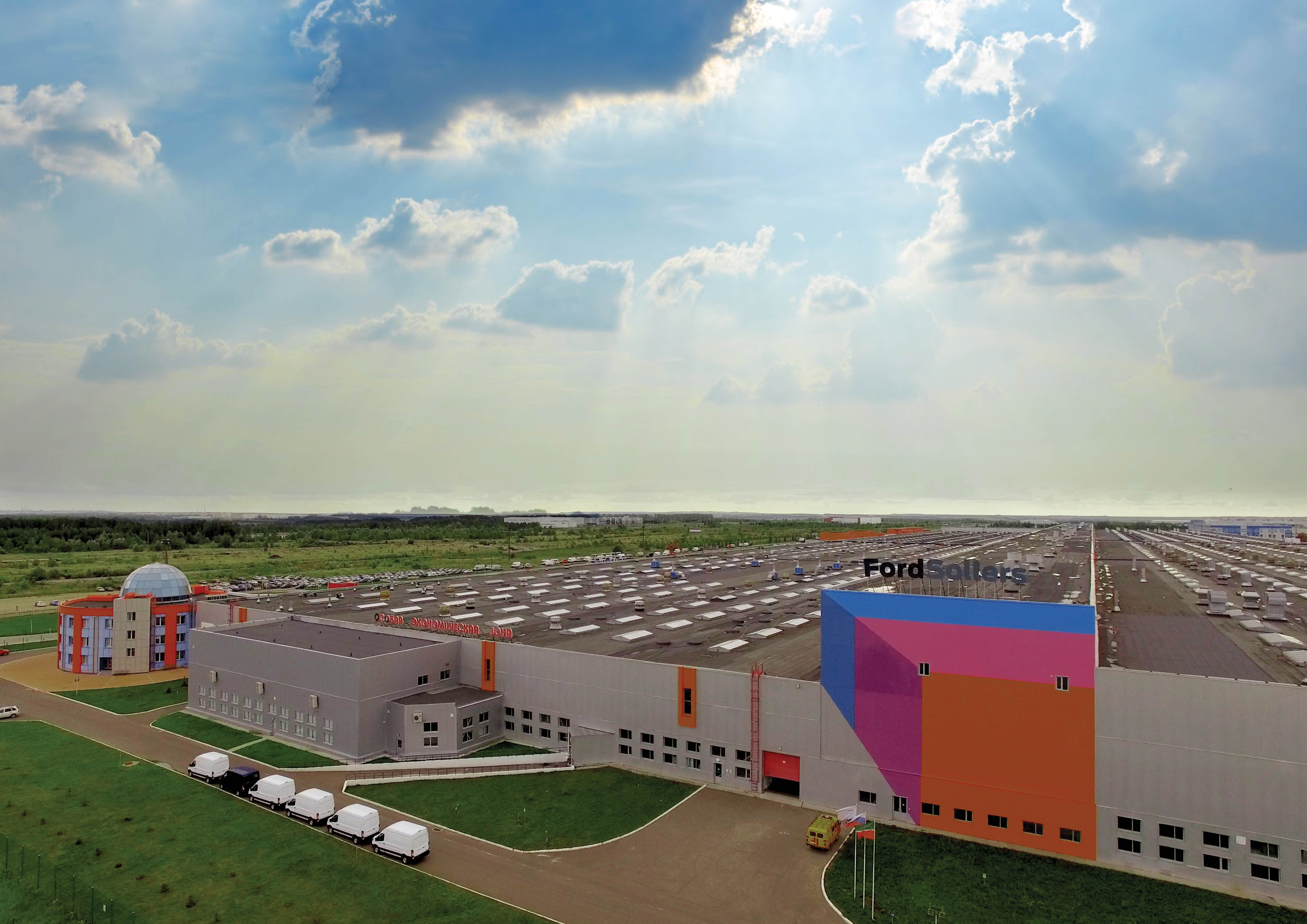
"Ford Sollers Elabuga" plant

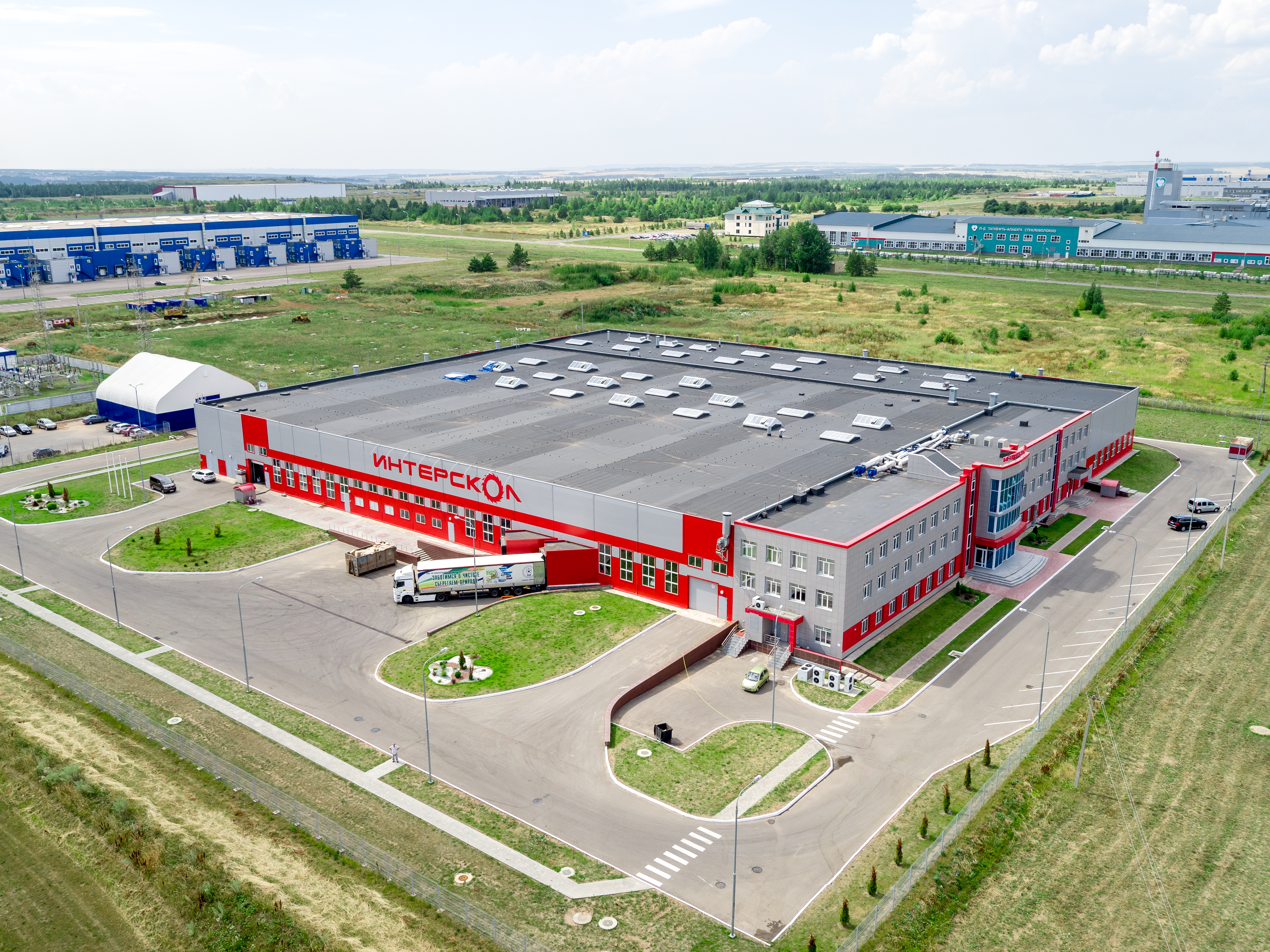
"Interskol" plant

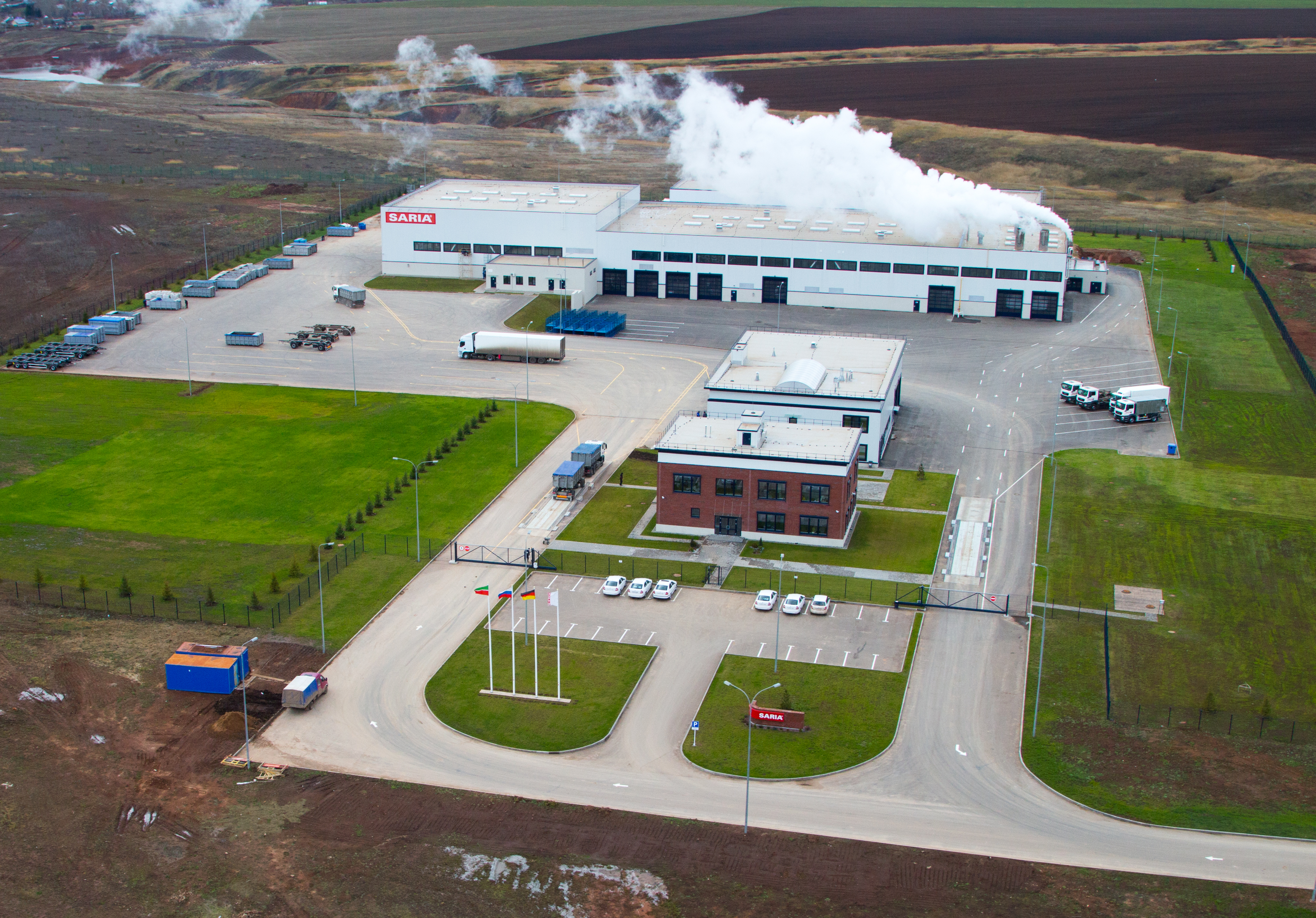
"Saria Bio-Industries Volga" plant

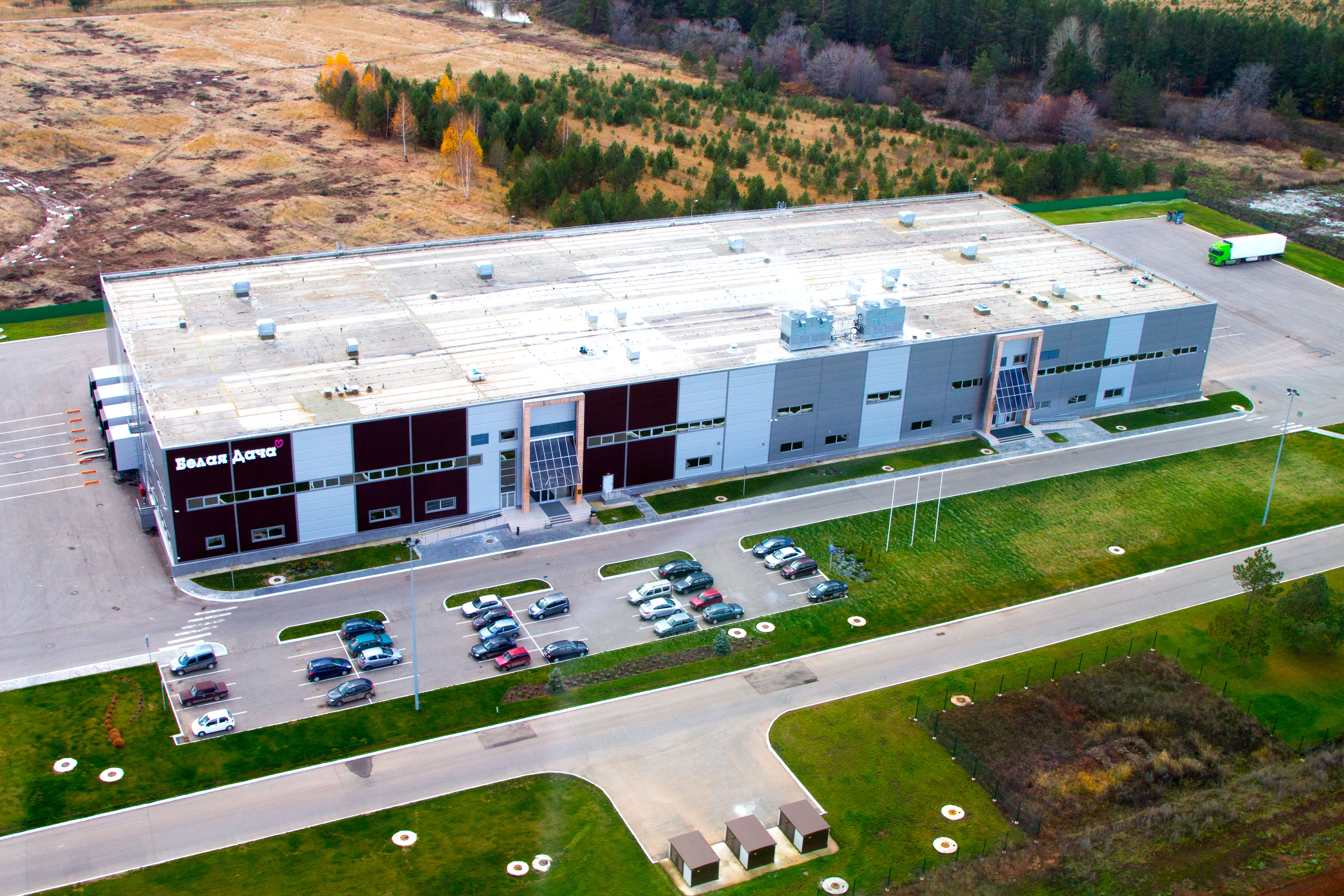
"Belaya Dacha Alabuga" plant

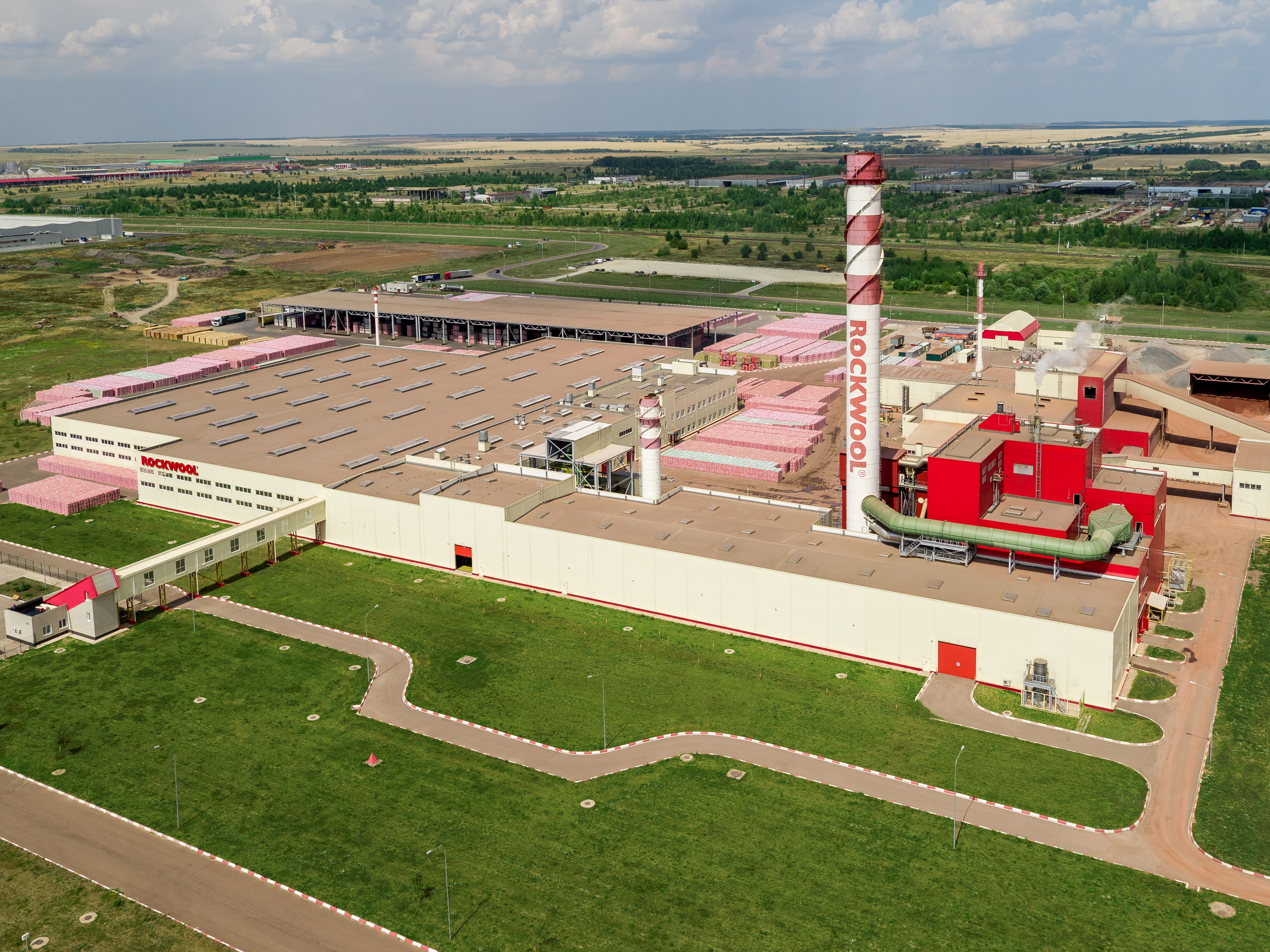
"Rockwool-Volga" plant

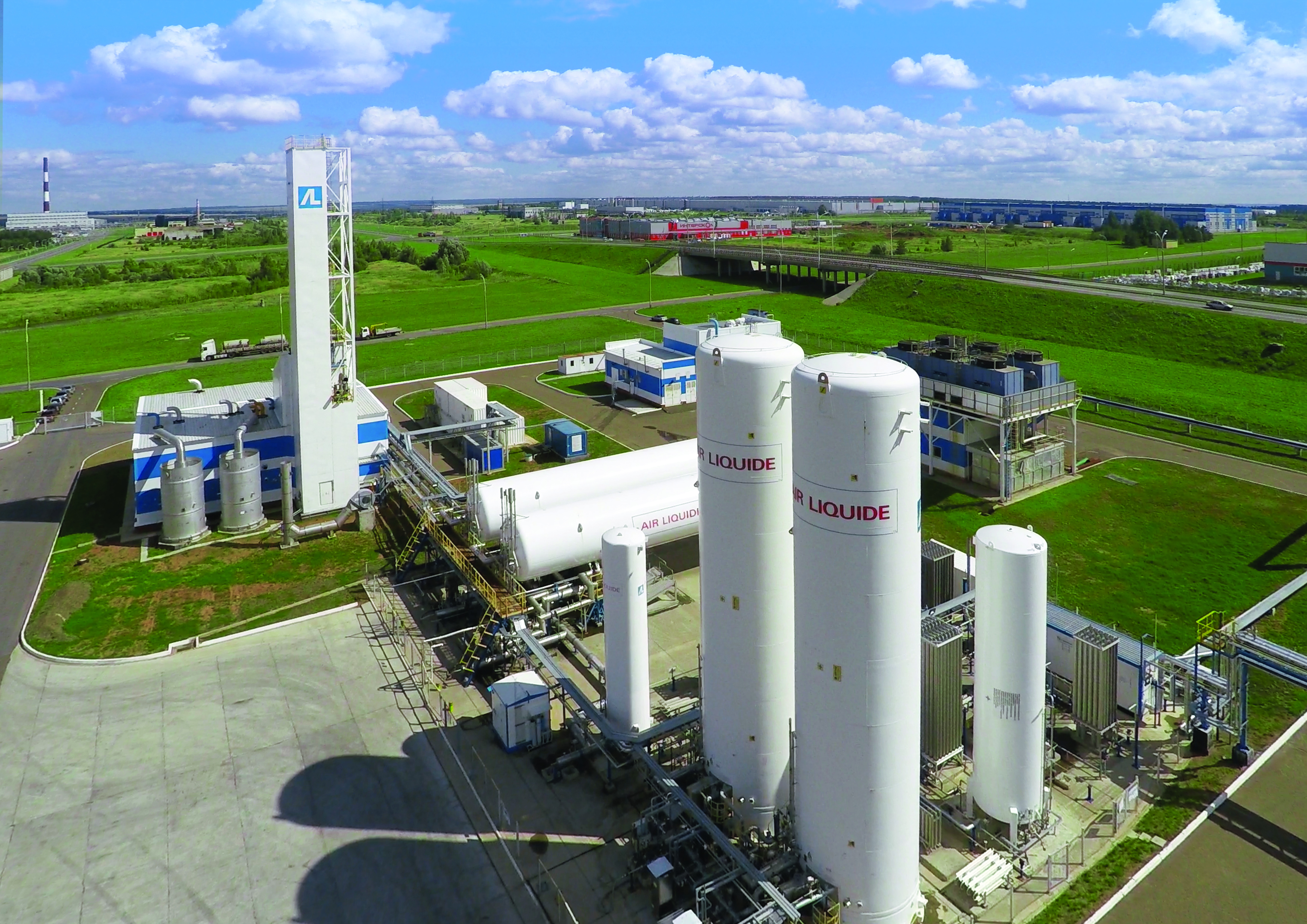
"Air Liquid Alabuga" plant

1. Drylock Technologies;— a plant of a Belgian company Drylock Technologies producing hygiene products. The enterprise opened on 8 October 2016.
2. Trakya Glass Rus — a joint project of a Turkish holding Şişecam (70%) and the French company Saint-Gobain producing flat glass, mirrors and glasses with spraying. The plant produces 230 thousand tons of flat glass per year. The enterprise opened on 8 October 2016.
3. Automotive Glass Alliance Rus — automotive glass production manufacturing 800 thousand sets per year. The company opened on 8 October 2016.
4. Dizyan Rus Alabuga — the polymer pipes production of the Turkish company Dizayn group. 23,3 thousand tons of product is manufactured per year. The company operates since 25 November 2015.
5. 3M Volga — a project of 3M company. 3M Volga produces industrial goods, anti-corrosive coatings, abrasives, glass microspheres, industrial adhesive materials and adhesive tapes. The plant was put into action in October 2015. Завод был введён в эксплуатацию в октябре 2015 года
6. Armstrong Building Products — a dropped ceiling systems plant of Armstrong World Industries company. The declared production capacity — 22 million sqm per year. The enterprise open on 9 June 2015.
7. Havi Logistics Yelabuga — production and distribution centre of Havi Logistics company, which provides delivery for McDonald's chain of restaurants. The complex includes 5832 sqm of warehouses and 1080 sqm of the administrative area; it was put into operation in June 2015.
8. Huhtamaki Foodservice Alabuga — a manufacturer of disposable tableware is owned by the Finnish Huhtamäki and collaborates with McDonald's chain of restaurants. The production line, designed to produce 641 million items per year, was launched in June 2015.
9. Alabuga-Fiber — a carbon fibres manufacturer. The opening ceremony was on 15 May 2015.
10. Hayat Kimya — a sanitary hygienic paper manufacturer (toilet paper towels, napkins and tissues). Projected capacity is 65 thousand tons of products per year. The production was launched in March 2015.
11. Interskol-Alabuga — a manufacturer of power tools and small mechanisation tools. The company was launched in October 2014. The projected capacity of the existing manufacturing line - 1,25 million pieces of equipment per year. 2nd and 3rd stages are under construction. That will increase production to up to 5 million pieces of equipment per year.
12. Kastamonu Integrated Wood Industry — a subsidiary of a Turkish manufacturer MDF, producing melamine coated and uncoated medium-density fibreboards, flooring and furniture panels. The enterprise's projected capacity is 457 thousand sqm per year. It was officially opened in September 2014.
13. Coşkunöz Alabuga — a plant of a Turkish company Coşkunöz Holding. It produces car metal body parts for Ford Sollers holding Ltd. The company opened on 29 August 2014.
14. RMA-Rus — a steel ball valves production. The enterprise was launched in May 2014. Projected capacity is 11 thousand units of products per year.
15. Saria Bio-Industries Volga — a production of technical and feeding fat, bone meal from animal waste. The company belongs to German SARIA Bio-Industries. The company has operated since September 2013.
16. Vertical-Alabuga — concrete and reinforced concrete production. The capacity is up to 94 thousand m3 per year. The company has operated since 2013.
17. Belaya Dacha Alabuga — salads and vegetable products processing plant. Capacity is 12 thousand tons of products per year. The launch of production was held on 29 August 2012.
18. Rockwool-Volga — a subsidiary of Rockwool International, a Danish manufacturer of mineral wool. The factory was launched in April 2012 and became one of Europe's largest enterprises producing wool heat insulating products.
19. Ford Sollers Elabuga — car and engines production, a joint venture of Ford and Sollers companies. The projected capacity — 85 thousand cars and 185 thousand engines per year. The automotive plant began to work in January 2012. Engine plant was put into operation on 3 September 2015.
20. Air Liquide Alabuga — a subsidiary of Air Liquide; industrial gas production. The first stage of the enterprise (air-distribution installation for the needs of P-D Tatneft-Alabuga Fiberglass) was put into operation July 2010, the second — in May 2012. In August 2014 a complex producing the hydrogen-nitric mixture for the plant "Trakya Glass Rus" was launched.
21. P-D Tatneft-Alabuga Fiberglass — a company which manufactures fiberglass and products on its basis. The first stage the production was launched in November 2009. Projected capacity — 21 thousand tons of ready products per year.
22. Polimatiz — an enterprise manufacturing nonwoven fabric on the basis of polypropylene. Production capacity is more than 17 thousand tons of ready product per year. The production was launched in July 2009.

=== Prospects ===
In December 2016, Alabuga reached a principal agreement on cooperation with the Tianjin Economic-Technological Development Area (TEDA), one of the first and most successful free economic zones in China. Among prospects were: attracting more than 60 resident companies from China to the Tatarstan special economic zone; making TEDA the Alabuga shareholders through selling them one part of the additional emission of JSC "SEZ IPT Alabuga" shares, planned for 2018–2019; creating a joint venture — the audit-consulting firm PriceWaterhouseCoopers was engaged in the development of this project.

At the St. Petersburg International Economic Forum in 2017, the Republic of Tatarstan and Rosatom State Atomic Energy Corporation signed an agreement to build a plant in Alabuga to produce polyacrylonitrile fiber, the main raw material for the production of carbon fiber. The construction is planned for 2017–2020. When it reaches the projected capacity the enterprise will provide 700 jobs. It is planned that the plant will become a key investment project of an interregional composite industrial cluster that will unite the branch capacities of the Republic of Tatarstan, Moscow and Saratov regions into a single technological cycle for the production of composite materials.

== Awards ==
Since 2012, "Alabuga" has been included in the ratings of the best free economic zones fDi Intelligence — The Financial Times business unit. In the 2012-2013 rating, "Alabuga" was ranked #40. In 2014, it was awarded an honourable mention in the regional category (Europe). In the global ratings of 2015, 2016 and 2017, "Alabuga" was named the best special economic zone in Europe for large business. In 2016 and 2017, it also received an honourable mention in the global ranking of the SEZ for large companies.

"Alabuga" also received Russian industry awards: in particular, at the St. Petersburg International Economic Forum in 2015, the special economic zone was granted the Vnesheconombank's Development Prize as the "Best Project of Complex Territory Development".
