= Maurice Korir =

Kenyan business executive (born 1974)

Maurice Kimutai Korir
- Born: 28 May 1974 (age 52); Kenya
- Citizenship: Kenya
- Education: University of Nairobi; Bachelor of Commerce, Master of Business Administration, (Both in Finance); ICPAK; CPA (K); Investor Relations Society; Certificate
- Occupation: Corporate executive
- Years active: 2007–present
- Known for: Tax, Finance
- Title: CFO, Dentsu Aegis Network

Maurice Kimutai Korir (born 1974) is a C-Suite executive in the ranks of Dentsu Aegis Network, a subsidiary of Dentsu Inc. of Japan, as the Chief Finance Officer (CFO). His working experience cuts across multinational and local companies including Mobil Oil Kenya, Kencell Communication Ltd, Uchumi Supermarkets, Kenya Civil Aviation Authority, Ogilvy Kenya Group, Fountain Enterprises Programme (FEP) Holdings.

== Early life and education ==
Korir was born on 28 May 1974 in Mukumu, Kakamega County. He attended Alliance High School and holds a Bachelor of Commerce degree (Finance Option) and MBA in Finance, both from the University of Nairobi.

He is a Certified Public Accountant of Kenya CPA (K), and holds a Certificate in Investor Relations from the Investor Relations Society.

== Career ==
Korir was a Finance & Strategic Planning graduate trainee at Mobil Oil Kenya Ltd for 10 months from September 1998 before moving to Kencell Communication Ltd (Airtel Networks Ltd) in Mobile Telecommunications as Treasury Leader from September 2000 to May 2004. From mid-2004 he moved to the Retail sector after joining Uchumi Supermarkets as the Group Chief Accountant for 20 months before taking up a role as a Finance Manager at Kenya Civil Aviation Authority for 14 months from March 2006.

From the Aviation sector he ventured into the Advertising and Media Industry to serve as Group Finance Director then Chief Operating Officer at Ogilvy Kenya Group for a collective six and a half years from May 2007. He then moved to the Investment sector after joining Fountain Enterprises Programme (FEP) Holdings as the Group Chief Executive Officer where he served for three-and-a-half years from November 2014. From FEP he returned to the Advertising and Media Industry after joining Dentsu Aegis Network as Chief Finance Officer from August 2018.

== Recognition ==
In 2012, Korir was named to the Top 40 under 40 men in Kenya as organised by the Business Daily Africa
