= Kikelomo =

Nigerian given female name

- Gender: Female
- Language: Yoruba

Origin
- Origin: Nigerian
- Meaning: A child is to be cared for
- Region of origin: South-West Nigeria

Kíkẹ́lọmọ // is a common female given name of Yoruba origin. It derives from kíkẹ́-ni-ọmọ, which means "a child is to be cherished." A popular diminutive is "Kike".

== Notable people named Kikelomo ==
- Kikelomo Longe, Nigerian politician
- Florence Kikelomo Ajayi, Nigerian football defender
