= CSOX =

CSOX can refer to:

- Keeping the Promise for a Strong Economy Act (Budget Measures), 2002, a legislative bill effective April 7, 2003 which provides for regulation of securities issued in the Canadian province of Ontario.
- a reporting mark assigned to Citgo Petroleum Corporation
