= Gary LaBranche =

American executive (born 1958)

Gary A. LaBranche
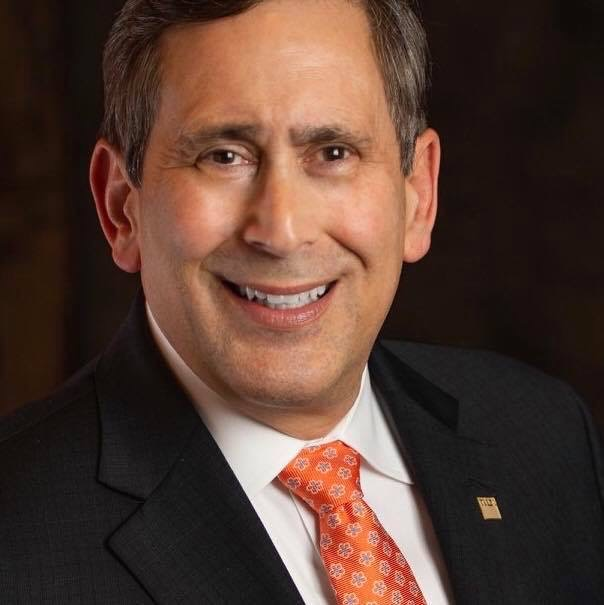
- Born: Gary A. LaBranche; June 18, 1958 (age 68); Lowell, Massachusetts, US
- Education: Ohio State University
- Occupation: CEO of Risk and Insurance Management Society

Gary A. LaBranche (born 18 June 1958 in Lowell, Massachusetts) is a distinguished association CEO, author, speaker, strategy consultant and board director.

== Education ==
He attended Lorain County Community College and, in 2024, was inducted into Lorain County Community College Commodore Hall of Fame inaugural class. He is a 1981 graduate of The Ohio State University.

== Career ==
Gary LaBranche is the CEO of The Risk and Insurance Management Society, Inc. (RIMS) effective June 1, 2022. RIMS is a professional association serving approximately 10,000 risk management professionals in over 60 countries.

Formerly, he was president and CEO of the National Investor Relations Institute (NIRI). NIRI's 3500 members include investor relations practitioners from 1600+ publicly traded companies with combined market valuation of $9 trillion. Prior to joining NIRI in 2017, he was President & CEO of the Association for Corporate Growth (2008-2017) and President & CEO of the Association Forum (2003-2008).

Named an ASAE Fellow (FASAE) in 1995, he received the ASAE Key Award in 2007 for his career achievement as an association CEO. Association Trends named him the Association Executive of the Year for 2012, for which he presented remarks entitled, "Four Freedoms of Association."

The Association Forum named him the recipient of the 2019 Samuel B. Shapiro Award for Chief Executive Achievement, the Forum's highest award for association CEOs.

He has been a member of the U.S. Chamber's Committee of 100 since 2004. LaBranche also served three years as CEO of CertiLearn, an e-learning company.

On the last day of the RISKWORLD 2023 conference in Atlanta - a RIMS conference managed by Gary LaBranche - there was an active shooter incident approximately two-and-a-half miles from the event. In the months following the incident, Gary led several initiatives to educate professionals about crisis management including co-authoring The Associations' Guide to Risk and Crisis Management issued via ASAE.

He was the 2013–2014 Board Chairman for ASAE's for-profit subsidiary, ASAE Business Services, Inc., and served on that board 2008–2018. LaBranche also served on the 2013–2014 ASAE Board of Directors and is a past member of the ASAE Foundation Board and the ASAE Insurance Company Board.

With his wife, Karen LaBranche, he is Managing Director of LaBranche Productions, LLC and is Executive Producer of the eco-horror film The Otherkind, with director-screenwriter Mary C. Russell and Producer Caroline O'Meara.

He has served two terms on the Vestry of St. Matthew's Episcopal Church in Evanston, IL.

In 2024 he joined the inaugural ASAE CEO Advisory Council in support of the Association Governance Institute.

== Mass shooting incident ==
On the final day of the RISKWORLD 2023 conference in Atlanta an event managed by LaBranche a mass shooting occurred approximately 2.5 miles from the venue, resulting in five injuries and one fatality. The incident disrupted access to conference hotels and transportation as authorities searched for the suspect. In response, LaBranche and his team issued a shelter-in-place advisory for the approximately 10,000 attendees and canceled the remainder of the event as a precaution.

In the months following the incident, LaBranche co-chaired a Strategic Collaboration with ASAE and ASIS to educate professionals about crisis management and co-authored The Associations' Guide to Risk and Crisis Management offered at no charge by ASAE.

== Media ==
He is the author of more than 350 columns, podcasts, and articles on association management. LaBranche has delivered over 350 presentations and provided strategic planning and management consulting to more than 300 associations worldwide. He was profiled as an innovative leader in Hope: How Triumphant Leaders Create The Future by Andrew Razeghi. His publications include Perspectives on the Future of Association Trade Shows and Exhibits (The Leadership Edge Series), a chapter titled “Managing the Complex Association Enterprise” in the ASAE Handbook of Professional Practices in Association Management, 3rd Edition (2015), and The Association CEO Succession Toolkit (2018), published by ASAE Association Management Press.

== Personal life ==
LaBranche lives with his wife, Karen and daughter Catie, in Evanston, IL. An active volunteer, LaBranche led Tau Kappa Epsilon International Fraternity as Grand Prytanis (International Chairman) from 1997–1999 and presided over the Fraternity's Centennial Celebration. In 2024, he was honored with the Tau Kappa Epsilon Franternity Circle of Excellence Award.
