= Kikelomo Longe =

Industry Trade & Investment, Ogun State

- Kike

Personal details
- Born: Nigeria
- Education: Accountancy
- Alma mater: University of Lagos
- Profession: Commissioner for Industry Trade and Investment

Kikelomo Longe, also known as Kike, once served as the commissioner for Industry Trade and Investment of Ogun State, Nigeria.

== Early life and education ==
Longe studied accountancy at the University of Lagos UNILAG and graduated with a second class upper BSc. degree in Accounting.

== Career ==
Longe was the former head of investor relations and fund administration at African Capital Alliance (ACA). She joined the organisation in 1999, and later rose to rank of vice president. She was a vice president of Africa Capital Alliance. She was responsible for marketing, fundraising and investor relations. She started her career with Deloitte as an audit trainee and won two national prizes at qualifying examinations and qualified as a chartered accountant. Later she joined Ventures & Trusts Limited (V&T) as the financial controller.
