= Investor relations =

Company communication with investors

Investor relations (IR) is a "strategic management responsibility that is capable of integrating finance, communication, marketing and securities law compliance to enable the most effective two-way communication between a company, the financial community, and other constituencies, which ultimately contributes to a company's securities achieving fair valuation." as defined by National Investor Relations Institute (NIRI). IR also functions to assess the impact of a company's actions (e.g., acquisitions, change in dividend policy, introduction of new product) on the company's position in the capital markets (e.g., stock price, competitive position, public perception).

The term describes the department of a company devoted to handling inquiries from shareholders and investors, as well as others who might be interested in a company's stock or financial stability.

== Structure ==
Typically, investor relations is a department or person reporting to the chief financial officer (CFO) or treasurer. In some companies, investor relations is managed by the public relations or corporate communications departments, and can also be referred to as "financial public relations" or "financial communications." In smaller companies, the IR function is often outsourced to independent investor relations firms. Investor relations is considered a specialty of public relations by the U.S. Department of Labor.

Many larger publicly traded companies now have dedicated IR officers (IROs), who oversee most aspects of shareholder meetings, press conferences, private meetings with investors, (known as "one-on-one" briefings), investor relations sections of company websites, and company annual reports. These reports are frequently self-published on the corporate website, though in the past, external services were more commonly used for mandatory disclosures. The investor relations function also often includes the transmission of information relating to intangible values such as the company's policy on corporate governance or corporate social responsibility. Recently, the field has trended toward an increasingly popular movement for "interactive data", and the management of company filings through streaming-data solutions such as XBRL or other forms of electronic disclosure have become prevalent topics of discussion amongst leading IROs worldwide.

The investor relations function must be aware of current and upcoming issues that an organization or issuer may face, particularly those that relate to fiduciary duty and organizational impact. In particular, it must be able to assess the various patterns of stock-trading that a public company may experience, often as the result of a public disclosure (or any research reports issued by financial analysts). The investor relations department must also work closely with the Corporate Secretary on legal and regulatory matters that affect shareholders.

While most IROs would report to the chief financial officer, they will also usually report to the chief executive officer (CEO) and board of directors and/or president of the corporation. This means that as well as being able to understand and communicate the company's financial strategy, they are also able to communicate the broader strategic direction of the corporation and ensure that the image of the corporation is maintained in a cohesive fashion.

The president or CEO of the company or corporation would have direct responsibility in relating the company's overall posture directly to the shareholders or the investors.

Due to the potential impact of legal liability claims awarded by courts, and the consequential impact on the company's share price, IR often has a role in crisis management of, for example, corporate downsizing, changes in management or internal structure, product liability issues and industrial disasters.

The professional member organization for investor relations in the United States is the National Investor Relations Institute (NIRI). In addition to numerous professional development seminars and meetings, NIRI offers a certification program, the Investor Relations Charter. In the United Kingdom, the recognized industry body is The Investor Relations Society, while in Canada, the professional association is called the Canadian Investor Relations Institute (CIRI). Australia's professional organization is known as the Australian Investor Relations Association (AIRA). Taiwan's professional organization is known as the Taiwan Investor Relations Institute (TIRI).

== The Sarbanes–Oxley Act ==
In the United States, the Sarbanes–Oxley Act of 2002 significantly increased the importance of investor relations in the financial markets. The act established new requirements for corporate governance and regulatory compliance, with an increased emphasis on accuracy in auditing and public disclosure. Notable provisions of the act which apply to investor relations include enhanced financial disclosures and accuracy of financial reports, real-time disclosures, off-balance-sheet transaction disclosures, pro forma financial disclosures, management assessment of internal controls, and corporate responsibility for financial reports. More specifically, Sarbanes–Oxley sections 301, 302, 404, and 802 have been of particular interest to companies improving corporate compliance.

Similar to Sarbanes–Oxley are the Keeping the Promise for a Strong Economy Act (Budget Measures), 2002 in Canada, Financial Security Law of France in France, and J-SOX in Japan. The European MiFID Directive, although principally concerned with investor protection, also covers regulation and compliance for listed European companies.

== See also ==
- Public relations
