= Financial Instruments and Exchange Act =

2006 Japanese law

The Financial Instruments and Exchange Act (金融商品取引法, Kin'yū shōhin torihiki-hō), is a Japanese law that is the main statute codifying securities law and regulating securities companies in Japan. It was promulgated on June 14, 2006.

The law provides for:

- Registration and regulation of broker dealers and their registered representatives
- Corporate financial disclosure obligations applicable to public companies, investment trusts and similar entities
- Tender offer rules
- Disclosure obligations applicable to large shareholders in public companies
- Internal controls in public companies; in this role the law is often referred to as J-SOX, a reference to the American Sarbanes-Oxley Act (SOX).

== Summary ==
The Act for the Amendment of the Securities and Exchange Act, etc. was passed at the 164th session of the Diet, reforming the 1946 Securities and Exchange Act, and updating the act's name to Financial Instruments and Exchange Act (FIEA). This law also abolished the Financial Futures Trading Act (Japanese: 金融先物取引法, romanized: Kin'yū Sakimono Torihiki Hō) and three other laws, incorporating their regulations into the FIEA. The law had three major aims: to encourage the use of financial services and instruments by extending consumer protection and increasing convenience; to increase perceived reliability in the securities market by enacting rules to ensure fairness and transparency; to reform the existing laws to conform to international standards in an increasingly globalized market. Based on these aims, the law developed four main pillars:

1. Establishing a cross-sectional legislative framework for investor protection covering financial products with strong investment characteristics (the so-called legal framework for investor services)
2. Enhancing disclosure requirements
3. Ensuring appropriate management of self-regulatory operations by exchanges
4. Strict countermeasures against unfair trading

== See also ==
- CLERP-9 – Australian version of the act
- Data Loss Prevention
- Keeping the Promise for a Strong Economy Act (Budget Measures), 2002 – A similar act in Ontario, Canada
