= Limbach L550E =

German aircraft engine

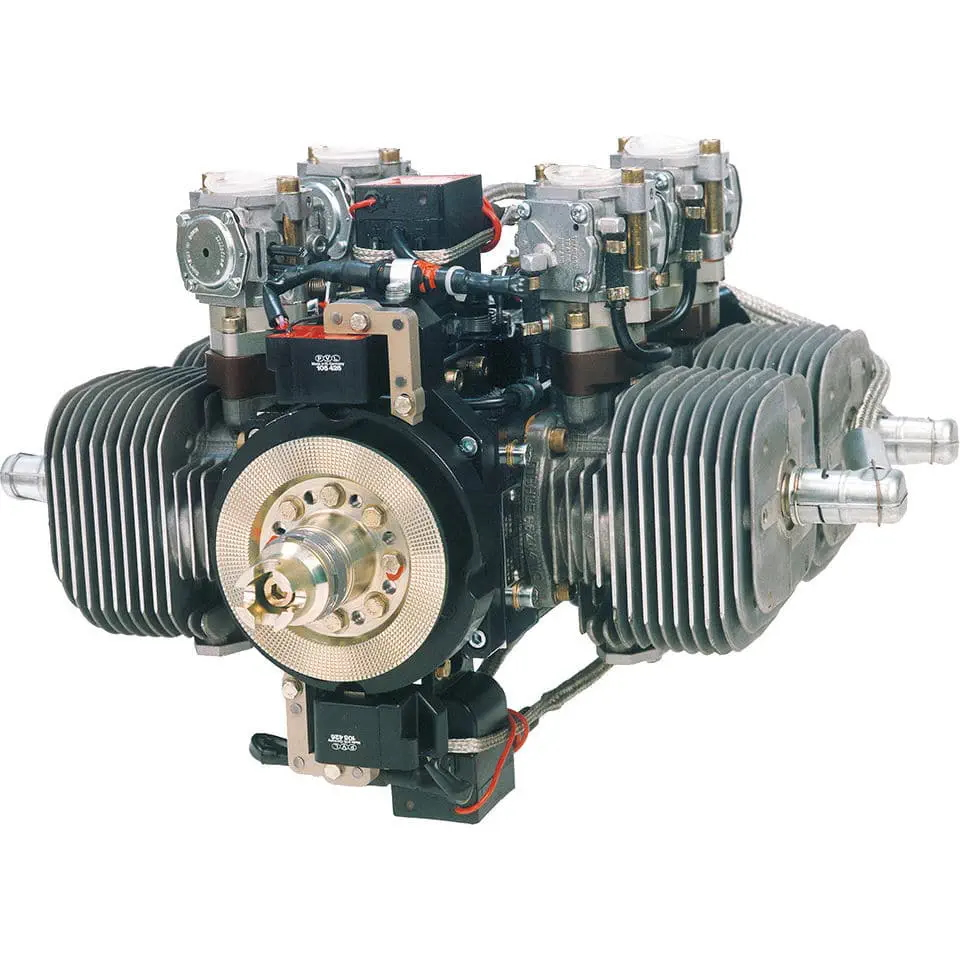
- LIMBACH L 550 E
- Type: Aircraft engine
- National origin: Germany
- Manufacturer: Limbach Flugmotoren
- Manufactured: 1987 onwards

The Limbach L550E is a German aircraft engine, designed and produced by Limbach Flugmotoren of Königswinter.

== Design and development ==
The L550E is an air-cooled horizontally-opposed 550cc four-cylinder two-stroke petrol engine developing 37 kW (50 hp) at 7500 rpm which can drive a propeller either directly or geared. It employs a single magneto ignition, four carburettors, and is lubricated by oil mixture lubrication with a fuel to oil ratio of 25:1 for mineral oil or 50:1 for synthetic oil.

=== Iranian copy ===
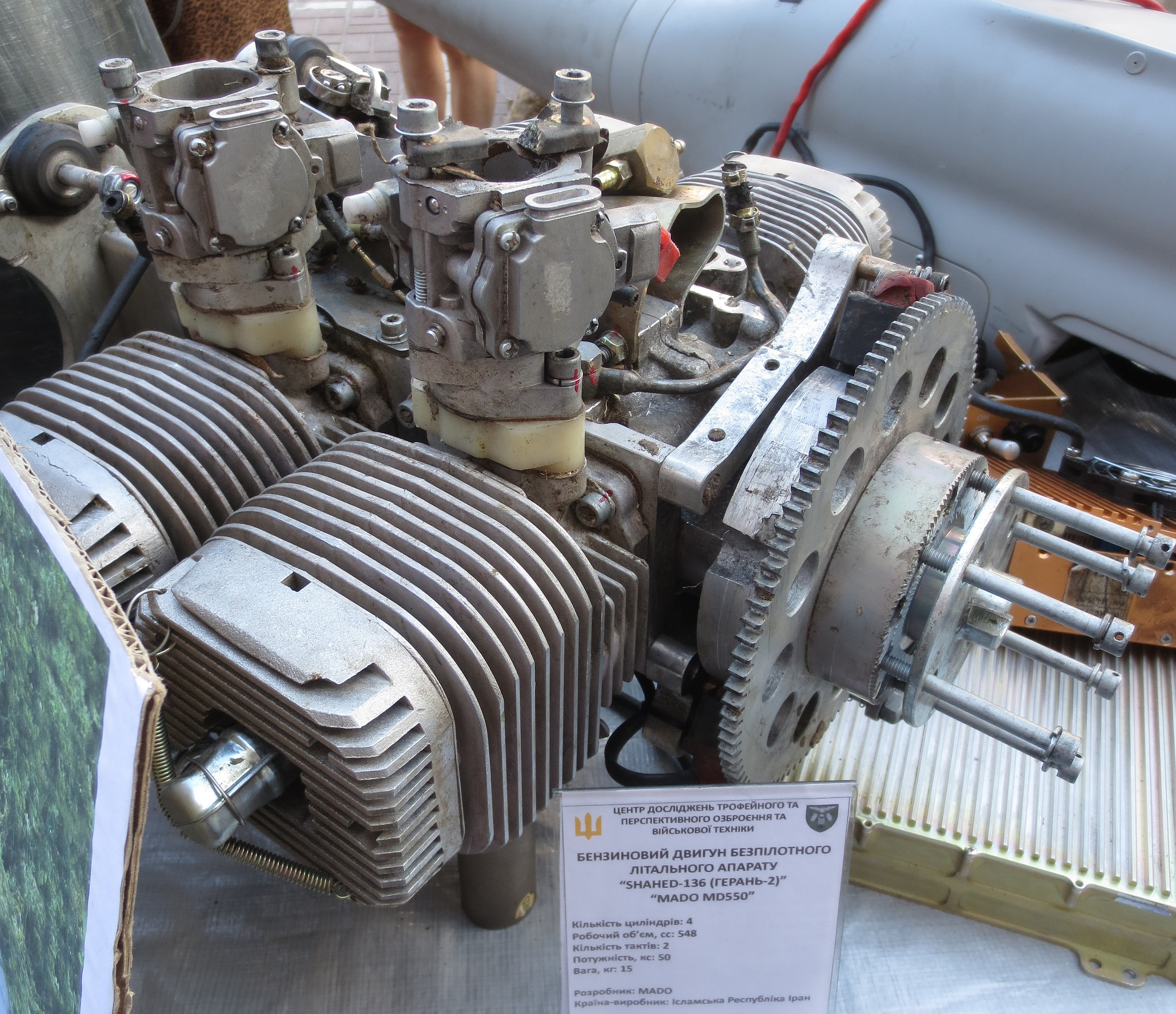
Iranian copy, recovered from a downed drone in Ukraine, 2023

Since at least 2014, the Iranian firm Mado has marketed a copy of the L550E, called MD550. The Mado variant is used for the Iranian Shahed-136 UAV.

According to a 2023 CNN investigation, Western intelligence officials and analysts believe the Iranian government illegally acquired the engine technology approximately 17 years earlier, enabling the development of domestic copies such as the MD550.

=== Russian copy ===
By 2024, the Russian army produced the "Shahed-136" in large quantity under the name "Geran-2" and installed a proprietary copy of the MD550 engine without a startermotor and with no flywheel. Ukrainian experts rated the quality of the Russian version lower than the Iranian version with only 4-5 hours runtime before total failure compared to 20 hours on the Iranian engines.

=== Xiamen Limbach ===
The Garpiya family of drones is powered by Limbach L550E from Xiamen Limbach.

== Specifications (L550E) ==
Data from World Directory of Leisure Aviation 2011-12 and manufacturer

=== General characteristics ===
- Type: Four-cylinder, two-stroke aircraft engine
- Bore: 66 mm (2.60 in)
- Stroke: 40 mm (1.57 in)
- Displacement: 548 cc (33.4 cu in)
- Length: 300 mm (11.8 in)
- Width: 410 mm (16.1 in)
- Height: 301 mm (11.9 in)
- Dry weight: 16 kg (35 lb)

=== Components ===
- Fuel type: 90 RON octane unleaded petrol or 100 LL Avgas
- Oil system: oil mixture lubrication, 25:1 fuel to oil ratio for mineral oil, 50:1 for synthetic oil
- Cooling system: air

=== Performance ===
- Power output: 37 kW (50 hp)

== See also ==
Related lists

- List of aircraft engines
