= National Investor Relations Institute =

American investor relations association

- Abbreviation: NIRI
- Formation: 1969; 57 years ago
- Type: 501(c)(6) professional association
- Headquarters: Alexandria, Virginia
- Location: United States
- Website: www.niri.org

The National Investor Relations Institute (NIRI) is a United States professional association for investor relations (IR) professionals. Located in Alexandria, Virginia, NIRI is the professional association of corporate officers and investor relations consultants responsible for communications among corporate management, shareholders, securities analysts and other financial publics. NIRI's more than 2,800 members represent over 1,350 publicly held companies and $7 trillion in stock market capitalization.

Through its collaborative community, NIRI advances engagement in the capital markets and drives best practices in corporate disclosures, governance, and informed investing. NIRI provides members with information resources, professional development and educational opportunities, and peer networking. NIRI acts as an advocate for the IR profession as well as the IR professional.

It publishes "best practices" guidelines for public companies which encourage companies to adopt a written disclosure policy.

In 2016, NIRI introduced the first Investor Relations professional credential in the U.S., the Investor Relations Charter(sm).

== History ==
NIRI was founded in 1969 and has 33 chapters located throughout the United States. A decade later, it had about 950 members and 20 chapters. Its first chapter outside the United States was established in Toronto in 1979 as NIRI Canada. The Canadian branch became independent in 1992, when it adopted the name Canadian Investor Relations Institute.

The institute launched the Investor Relations Charter (IRC) in November 2015, and the first examination was held in March 2016. The qualification was built around a competency framework based on an analysis of the work performed by investor-relations professionals.

== Standards and research ==
In March 2003, NIRI's board adopted a definition of investor relations as a strategic management function combining finance, communication, marketing, and compliance with securities law. The Encyclopedia of Public Relations describes this definition as widely used in professional and academic publications.

NIRI also publishes voluntary guidance on corporate disclosure. According to the organization, it began developing professional standards in 1996. Its publications include the Standards of Practice for Investor Relations: Disclosure and the Investor Relations Body of Knowledge.

NIRI's research has also been cited in regulatory debates. When the U.S. Securities and Exchange Commission adopted Regulation FD in 2000, it referred to a 1998 NIRI survey reporting that 26 percent of responding companies had used some form of selective disclosure. The commission also cited a February 2000 NIRI survey indicating that most responding issuers had begun opening at least some conference calls to individual investors. The Wall Street Journal has reported on other NIRI surveys, including studies of pro forma earnings measures and changes in corporate earnings guidance.

As of 2026, NIRI listed 25 chapters, including a virtual chapter for members without access to a local group.
