= Mado (manufacturer) =

Iranian company

The Iranian company known as Mado specializes in aircraft propulsion systems.

The managing director of the Mado company, Yousef Aboutaleni, was sanctioned by the United States in 2021 for his role in the MT Mercer Street bombing. The company's ownership list includes Islamic Revolutionary Guard Corps (IRGC) Brigadier General Abdollah Mehrabi.

== Sanctions ==
On 29 October 2021 the US added to its Specially Designated Nationals and Blocked Persons List both Aboutaleni and Mehrabi as well as Mado.

On 29 October 2022 Mado Company and Aboutaleni were designated pursuant to Executive Order 13382 for having provided, or attempted to provide, financial, material, technological, or other support for, or goods or services in support of, the IRGC. At the same time, Mehrabi was designated pursuant to E.O. 13382 for acting or purporting to act for or on behalf of, directly or indirectly, the IRGC ASF SSJO.

The organization has also been sanctioned for its contributions to the Russian invasion of Ukraine.

== Products ==
A non-exhaustive list, obtained from a 2014 trade fair, follows:

- Mado MD26 1-cylinder 2-stroke engine
- Mado MD275 2-cylinder, horizontally opposed 2-stroke engine
- Mado MD550: a 4-cylinder, horizontally opposed 2-stroke engine, copy of Limbach L550E
- MADO Wankel-type single-rotor engine similar in appearance to Chinese BMP MDR-208
- at least 8 types of wooden propellers
