= Investor Relations Society =

- Abbreviation: IR Society
- Formation: September 9, 1988; 37 years ago
- Type: Professional association
- Legal status: Society
- Purpose: Represent and promote investor relations practitioners
- Location: London, United Kingdom
- Region served: United Kingdom
- Services: Support the professional development of its members, to represent their views to government bodies and to act as a forum for its members
- Members: 600
- Chief executive: Laura Hayter
- Funding: Members fees
- Website: irsociety.org.uk

The Investor Relations Society (IR Society) is the professional body for investor relations professionals in the United Kingdom.

Investor Relations activities in the UK are covered by a number of legal and regulatory requirements including the Companies Act 2006, Financial Services and Markets Act 2000 and The Criminal Justice Act 1993. The Financial Services Authority in the UK also publishes indications of best practice. The Investor Relations Society runs educational programmes to assist with the understanding of the legal and regulatory framework in the UK.

The Investor Relations Society has counterparts in many other countries including the United States, Australia and The Netherlands.

== History ==
Established in 1980, The Investor Relations Society is a non-profit making institute and has almost 600 members drawn primarily from UK listed companies, as well as overseas companies operating in the UK. Its UK members represent two-thirds of companies listed on the FTSE 100 Index.
