= Keeping the Promise for a Strong Economy Act (Budget Measures), 2002 =

Ontario, Canada statute

The Keeping the Promise for a Strong Economy Act (Budget Measures), 2002, also known as Bill 198, was an Ontario legislative bill effective April 7, 2003, which provides for regulation of securities issued in the province of Ontario. The legislation encompasses many areas. It is perhaps best known for clauses that provide equivalent legislation to the U.S. Sarbanes–Oxley Act (SOx) to protect investors by improving the accuracy and reliability of corporate disclosures. Thus, it is also known as the "Canadian Sarbanes–Oxley" act or C-SOX (see-socks).

In October 2002, Janet Ecker, as Minister of Finance, introduced an omnibus bill in the legislature entitled Keeping the Promise for a Strong Economy Act (Budget Measures), 2002, now simply referred to as Bill 198. It was enacted as Chapter 22 of the Statutes of Ontario, 2002. Bill 198 received Royal Assent on December 9, 2002 and the amendments to the securities provisions of Bill 198 proclaimed in force on April 7, 2003. Bill 198 amends Part CXXIII.1 of the Ontario Securities Act.

As budgetary legislation, it touched on many different aspects of government operation. Provisions included measures about corporate disclosure, auto insurance and tax. Thus, only a small portion of Bill 198 was relevant to "Sarbanes–Oxley" issues.

In June 2003, all Canadian securities commissions (except the British Columbia Securities Commission) issued three regulations for public comment designed to build on Bill 198:

- Multilateral Instrument (MI) 52-108, which would require issuers of securities to employ only those auditors participating in an independent oversight program established by the Canadian Public Accountability Board.
- MI 52-109, which would require chief executive officers and chief financial officers to personally certify that their company's annual and interim filings do not contain any misrepresentations and that such filings fairly present the corporation’s financial condition; and
- MI 52-110, which regulates the role and composition of the audit committees of any company issuing securities.

MI 52-109 has been agreed to by the Canadian Securities Administrators (CSA) and covers additional SarbOx issues.

== See also ==
- Sarbanes–Oxley Act – the Public Company Accounting Reform and Investor Protection Act of 2002, commonly called SOX or Sarbox.
- Corporate Law Economic Reform Program Act 2004 – the Australian equivalent of Sarbanes–Oxley, commonly called CLERP-9.
- J-SOX – the Japanese equivalent of Sarbanes–Oxley
