= Fred Muhl =

American football, basketball and baseball coach (1880–1954)

Biographical details
- Born: April 3, 1880; Bloomington, Illinois, U.S.
- Died: October 23, 1954 (aged 74); Normal, Illinois, U.S.

Playing career

Football
- 1903: Illinois
- Position: Quarterback

Coaching career (HC unless noted)

Football
- 1906: Illinois Wesleyan
- 1909–1920: Illinois Wesleyan

Basketball
- 1910–1921: Illinois Wesleyan

Baseball
- 1926: Illinois Wesleyan

Fred L. Muhl (April 3, 1880 – October 23, 1954) was an American football, basketball and baseball coach. He served as the head football (1906, 1909–1920), head men's basketball (1910–1921) and head baseball (1926) coach at Illinois Wesleyan University.
